= Bruce Logan (author) =

New Zealand conservative Christian writer

Bruce Logan (born 1938) is a New Zealand conservative Christian author who has been involved in, and is in opposition to liberal social policies within his country for over two decades.

== Biography ==
Logan was Head of English at Orewa College in Auckland, until he moved south to Christchurch in the mid-1990s. He became curriculum director at Middleton Grange School, New Zealand's largest evangelical/Christian (Integrated) school at the time. While employed there, Logan also acted as Director for the New Zealand Education Development Foundation (NZEDF), which attempted to interest centre-right political parties in education concerns such as school choice, school bulk funding, the abolition of outcome-based education strategies and a deregulated post-compulsory tertiary education sector.

In Cutting Edge, Logan often reprinted articles from the Institute for Economic Affairs (United Kingdom), British journalist Melanie Phillips, First Things (United States) edited by Richard John Neuhaus, and other Anglo-American and Australian social conservative publications.

He wrote several books for NZEDF, including A Questionable Conception (1998), which opposed comprehensive sex education; A Level Playing Field? (1996), which advocated school "choice". He also wrote Marriage: Do We Need It? (1998) which explored the critical role marriage plays in civil society.

In 2000, the New Zealand Education Development Foundation metamorphosed into the Maxim Institute. Logan served as its first director and also operated out of Christchurch-based offices, as the Institute had offices in Christchurch and Auckland. Middleton Grange provided premises for their Christchurch offices. Logan also published Evidence, the institute's "policy journal", which ran for fifteen issues (2001–2005).

After the formation of the institute, Logan wrote Same Sex Marriage? (2000) for Affirm, a Tauranga-based New Zealand Presbyterian organisation opposed to civil unions, and lesbian and gay ordination within its denomination. In 2004 he wrote Waking Up to Marriage which repeated and supplemented earlier conservative social scientific research which encouraged promotion of heterosexual marriage over heterosexual cohabitation, and legal recognition of lesbian/gay civil unions, for the Maxim Institute.

During his time at the institute, Logan campaigned against New Zealand's prostitution law reform, euthanasia, lesbian and gay civil unions in New Zealand and other issues related to feminism, family policy and bioethics.

In October 2005 a Christchurch Press reader noticed that a couple of sentences in the fortnightly column written by Alexis Stuart (Logan's daughter and Maxim supporter) were identical to sentences in an article by Logan published on the Maxim Institute website. It remains unclear as to who copied what from whom.

On 17 October 2005, Paul Litterick of the New Zealand Association of Rationalists and Humanists used Copyscape, a web-based plagiarism detection service, to analyse Logan's published newspaper work. He alleged plagiarism in Logan's work, and published the results in the Fundy Post (Issues 18 and 19), an online chronicle of the alleged excesses of New Zealand conservative Christians and other faith-based elements. Litterick found that some of Logan's work was taken (in most cases with permission) from Anglo-American sources, which include The Heritage Foundation, Institute for American Values and National Fatherhood Institute, Maggie Gallagher (a US social conservative journalist), Melanie Phillips (UK), Conservative Christian Fellowship (UK) and Digby Anderson, Social Affairs Unit (UK).

In November 2005, Logan retired from the Maxim Institute.

In 2006 he published a handful of articles: one article for New Zealand's non-denominational Christian newspaper Challenge Weekly, four others for the Otago Daily Times, and two online opinion pieces for former ACT List MP and neoconservative Muriel Newman's New Zealand Centre for Political Debate (now renamed the New Zealand Centre for Political Research). On 24 September 2006, Logan contributed an article to the New Zealand Centre for Political Debate opposing central government administration of welfare state policies. On 14 April 2007, he followed this with another article critical of Sue Bradford's private member's bill to abolish parental corporal punishment of children in New Zealand, which referred to the earlier abolition of corporal punishment in New Zealand schools in 1990.

On 26 October 2006, Logan was a workshop presenter at the conservative Christian organisation Family First's presentation of "Principles of Marriage and the Family" during a symposium entitled the New Zealand Forum on the Family at Butterfly Creek, Auckland. He was not a keynote presenter at the symposium in question. On 22 May 2016, Bruce Logan was cited at the Family First website as a member of Family First New Zealand's Board of Directors

In August 2012, Logan wrote an opinion piece in the New Zealand Herald, labelling same-sex marriage as a threat to New Zealand's civil liberties.

== Bibliography ==
=== Books ===
- A Level Playing Field? Christchurch: New Zealand Education Development Foundation, 1994. ISBN 0-473-03168-X
- Marriage: Do We Need It? Christchurch: NZEDF, 1998. ISBN 0-473-05628-3
- A Questionable Conception. Christchurch: NZEDF, 1996. ISBN 0-473-03261-9
- Same Sex Marriage? Tauranga: AFFIRM Publications, 2000. ISBN 0-9582113-2-9
- Waking Up to Marriage. Auckland: Maxim Institute, 2004. ISBN 0-473-09787-7

=== Newspaper articles ===
- "How a Government Taxes is the Best Indicator of its Character". Otago Daily Times. 4 July 2006.
- "Real Men Should Be Strong and Good". Otago Daily Times. 25 August 2006.
- "Individuals Rights Lost in Rush to 'Freedom'". Otago Daily Times. 15 September 2006.
- "Denial of Evil Utopian Delusion". Otago Daily Times. 10 October 2006.

=== Online writing ===
- "Welfare - who needs it?". New Zealand Centre for Political Debate (24 September 2006)
- "The rise of violence in schools". New Zealand Centre for Political Research (14 April 2007)
