= Maxim Institute =

Public policy think tank in New Zealand

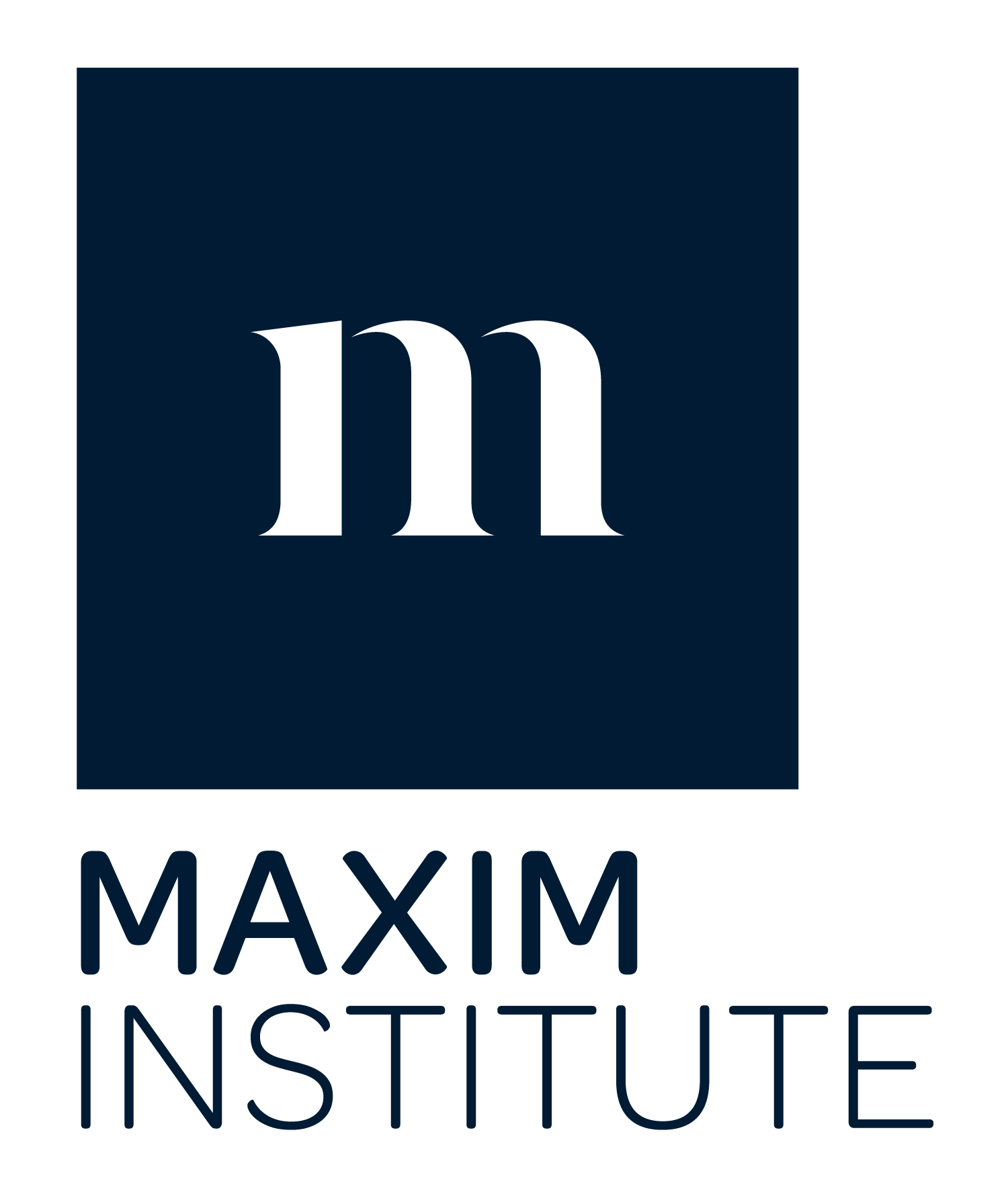
The Maxim Institute logo

The Maxim Institute is an independent research and public policy think tank based in Auckland, New Zealand. The institute's work has largely been focused on education, tax, and welfare policy.

Maxim Institute's mission statement is "working to promote the dignity of every person in New Zealand, by standing for freedom, justice, compassion, and hope."

== Work ==
Since its founding in 2001, Maxim Institute has supported a greater role for civil society and community in New Zealand life, notably in education, welfare, and social service provision.

The Institute has undertaken extensive research in a number of areas. Most notable amongst their reports are those on AI research, education, the heart of poverty, law & government, and palliative care, focusing primarily on New Zealand affairs.

It has published a wide range of op-eds and analyses on these and other subjects in newspapers focusing on New Zealand and also produces research and submissions on law and policy. Since its inception, Maxim Institute has also run an internship programme.

The Maxim Institute has also published ‘Flint and Steel’ an annual journal designed to stimulate productive public debate across party lines.

The Institute has been involved in public debate on a number of educational policy issues. These include private school funding, teacher registration and training options, bulk funding, and related concerns. As it originally arose from the "Education Development Foundation" as its precursor organisation before it rebranded, this is not illogical, although educational policy issues have been a diminished focus since 2001. During the Logan era, freedom of expression, social justice, democracy, and constitutional issues were emphasised. The Institute produces research and publications and advocates for fiscal restraint in public policy. It regularly organizes a series of political forums and has developed websites in the lead-up to New Zealand general elections for the sake of educating voters about the electoral process.

The Institute holds the annual Sir John Graham Lecture to promote ‘thought-provoking insights and deepen public dialogue.’

== Bruce Logan Era: 2001-2005 ==
Maxim Institute first gained public recognition in 2003 when it opposed the Prostitution Reform Bill. The Institute stated that the Bill would legitimise and increase the exploitation of women in New Zealand. It also opposed the Civil Union and Relationships Statutory References Bills in the following year.

== Greg Fleming Era: 2005- ==
After the retirement of Bruce Logan, the Institute moved to emphasize fiscal restraint. Thus, it has also supported other measures which support localising decision making. Maxim Institute has also endorsed restorative justice, parental choice of schools, democratic involvement, performance related pay for teachers, strong communities, limited government, low taxes and personal responsibility.

The Institute holds regular forums, including one held at the Auckland Town Hall and centred on the theme of social justice. Speakers have included Youth Court Judge Andrew Becroft, University of Canterbury Professor David Fergusson and Researcher Professor Peter Saunders.

In 2008, it held the first of its Annual John Graham Lectures. This was delivered by Professor Jeremy Waldron of NYU Law School and titled "Parliamentary Recklessness: Why we need to legislate more carefully".

The Institute also holds regular public lectures on topics such as tax and social justice, encouraging public participation through renewed emphasis on redistributive taxation policies to ensure equality of opportunity, alongside an emphasis with Localism.

== History ==
Maxim Institute was founded on 12 November 2001 by Greg Fleming (formerly general manager of Parenting with Confidence) and Bruce Logan, a former Headmaster, and former director of the New Zealand Education Development Foundation (NZEDF) in Christchurch. John Graham (then University of Auckland Chancellor) also played a role in the institute's founding.

After serving four years as the institute's director, Bruce Logan retired in 2005 and was replaced by Greg Fleming. Maxim Institute's Christchurch office closed in early 2006.

The current executive director of the Maxim Institute is Tim Wilson.

== Publications ==
Maxim Institute has published various books and reports on issues including political correctness, curriculum, and marriage law. These books include Silent Legacy: The unseen ways great thinkers have shaped our culture, which considers the history of western philosophy. Pursuing Social Justice in New Zealand, a collection of essays from prominent New Zealanders looking at creating strong communities. From Innocents to Agents, which looks at the politicisation of children in New Zealand. Vying for our Children, which examines various education philosophies. It also formerly published a quarterly journal entitled Evidence. According to Maxim Institute Evidence "explore[d] the critical issues facing New Zealand society today, including education, family and welfare. Evidence provided commentaries and analyses that were heavily relied on Anglo-American and Australian religious and social conservative pressure groups. As of Issue 15 (Spring 2005), Evidence ceased publication, as Bruce Logan was its former editor.

The Institute produces a monthly email called Real Issues, which focuses on "provoking analysis of developments in policy and culture in New Zealand and around the world".

As well as Real Issues, Maxim also published an ongoing series of educational research reports based on research by Colmar Brunton, called The Parent Factor, related to parental choice in education access, government funding and opposition to centralisation.

The Institute also drafts submissions on a range of public policy issues. The issues have included sedition law reform, electoral finance, victims' rights, freedom of expression,, prostitution, civil unions, and democratic reform. It has primarily emphasised fiscal restraint on tax and welfare policy since 2005.

== Awards ==
In 2005, Managing Director Greg Fleming was one of six New Zealanders to receive an Emerging Leader Award from the Sir Peter Blake (sailor) Trust.

== Controversies ==
=== Plagiarism ===
On 17 October 2005, Paul Litterick of the New Zealand Association of Rationalists and Humanists used Copyscape , a web-based plagiarism detection service, to analyse Logan's published newspaper work. He alleged plagiarism in Logan's work, and published the results in the Fundy Post (Issues 18 and 19), an online chronicle of the alleged excesses of New Zealand conservative Christians and other faith-based elements. Litterick found that some of Logan's work was taken (with permission) from Anglo-American sources, which include The Heritage Foundation, Institute for American Values, National Fatherhood Institute, Maggie Gallagher (a U.S. social conservative journalist), Melanie Phillips (UK), Conservative Christian Fellowship (UK) and Digby Anderson, Social Affairs Unit (UK). Later that year, Logan retired from the Maxim Institute.

=== "NZ Votes" ===
In 2005 the Maxim Institute ran a project leading up to the New Zealand general election, 2005 called "NZ Votes." The campaign featured a website and 30 debates between electorate candidates around the country. On its website, the NZ Votes project described itself as a "non profit and non partisan" and as a "community service" designed to inform voters about MMP. However, Nicky Hager criticised the institute's candidate database in his book The Hollow Men (2006), and also alleged that there had been close ties between the New Zealand National Party and a series of educational policy booklets that attacked New Zealand Labour Party government stances on such issues. However, another book, The Baubles of Office, by Stephen Levine and Nigel Roberts, makes a point of highlighting the political neutrality of nzvotes.org.

In June 2011, the Institute advertised that it had invited Iain Duncan Smith, United Kingdom secretary of state for welfare and pensions, head of the Centre for Social Justice and former leader of the Conservative Party of the United Kingdom and the Opposition (2001–2003). This has raised some questions about whether the institute's days of social conservative emphasis are as far behind it as its recent public policy statements and analyses suggest. Duncan Smith is an outspoken social conservative on issues like abortion, civil partnerships and inclusive adoption reform in the United Kingdom

=== Frank Ellis visit ===
In 2004, Dr Frank Ellis, a University of Leeds lecturer, spoke at a conference hosted by the Maxim Institute on political correctness and its reputed origins in Soviet Communism. Ellis was later suspended from his post when it emerged he had endorsed the British National Party, and for his alleged ties to white nationalist groups.
