= Dale Carpenter =

American legal scholar

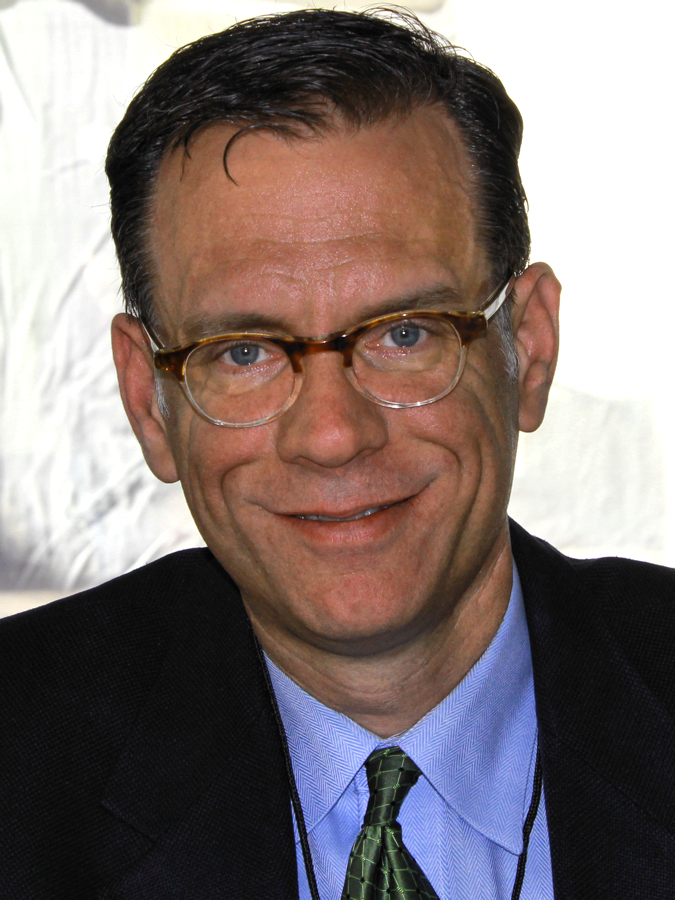
Dale Carpenter at the 2012 Texas Book Festival.

Dale Carpenter (born December 27, 1966) is an American legal commentator and professor of law at the Southern Methodist University Dedman School of Law. He formerly served as the Earl R. Larson Professor of Civil Rights and Civil Liberties Law at the University of Minnesota Law School for sixteen years. As a professor, Carpenter specializes in constitutional law, the First Amendment, Due Process and Equal Protection clauses, sexual orientation and the law, and commercial law.

Carpenter is a frequent speaker on issues surrounding same-sex marriage. Outside of traditional legal academic circles, he also wrote a regular column, "OutRight", for several gay publications across the United States. He is a regular contributor to the Independent Gay Forum as well as the weblog "The Volokh Conspiracy" and is regularly cited in American mainstream media.

== Early life and education ==
Carpenter received his B.A. degree in history, magna cum laude, from Yale College in 1989. He received his J.D. degree, with honors, from the University of Chicago Law School in 1992. At the University of Chicago he was editor-in-chief of the University of Chicago Law Review. He received both the D. Francis Bustin Prize for excellence in legal scholarship and the John M. Olin Foundation Scholarship for Law & Economics.

Carpenter clerked for The Honorable Edith Jones of the United States Court of Appeals for the Fifth Circuit from 1992 to 1993. After his clerkship, he practiced at Vinson & Elkins in Houston and at Howard, Rice, Nemerovski, Canady, Falk & Rabkin in San Francisco. He is a member of the state bars of Texas and California.

He won a Lambda Literary Award in 2013 for Flagrant Conduct: The Story of Lawrence v. Texas, in the category of LGBT Non-Fiction.

In July, 2016, Professor Carpenter joined nearly two-dozen other academics and politicians signing a letter urging Donald Trump supporters to reconsider their likely votes in the November 2016 election. Other signatories to the letter included David Blankenhorn, founder of the Institute for American Values, Professor John J. DiIulio, Jr. of the University of Pennsylvania, and former Republican congressman Mickey Edwards.

== Career Life ==
Carpenter teaches and writes in the areas of constitutional law, the First Amendment, and sexual orientation and the law. In 2007, he was appointed the Earl R. Larson Professor of Civil Rights and Civil Liberties Law. He was the Julius E. Davis Professor of Law for 2006-07 and the Vance K. Opperman Research Scholar for 2003-04. Professor Carpenter was chosen the Stanley V. Kinyon Teacher of the Year for 2003-04 and 2005–06 and was the Tenured Teacher of the Year for 2006-07. Since 2004, he has served as an editor of Constitutional Commentary.

Carpenter is openly gay. He is a frequent television, radio, and print commentator on constitutional law, the First Amendment, and sexual orientation and the law. Throughout his career life, he has published many opinion pieces on the Washington Post, many under being placed under the "Volokh Conspiracy" category. Some of his pieces include: "How soon could same-sex marriage be decided by the Supreme Court?", "Dishonorable Disobedience", and "Top Minnesota faculty committee backs free speech resolution".

Carpenter considers himself a libertarian-leaning conservative. He is noted for his scholarship on same-sex rights in the United States. He co-authored an Amicus brief for Lawrence v. Texas (2003) on behalf of the Republican Unity Coalition, a gay-straight Republican organization.

== Publications ==
- Flagrant Conduct: The Story of Lawrence v. Texas. New York: W. W. Norton & Company. 2012. ISBN 9780393062083.

== Selected articles ==
- "Bad Arguments For and Against Gay Marriage", 7 Florida Coastal L. Rev. 181 (2005)
- "Four Arguments Against the Federal Marriage Amendment That Even an Opponent of Gay Marriage Should Accept", 2 St. Thomas L. Rev. 71 (2004)
- "The Unknown Past of Lawrence v. Texas", 102 Mich. L. Rev. 1464 (2004)
- "Is Lawrence Libertarian?", 88 Minn. L. Rev. 1140 (2004)
- "The Antipaternalism Principle in the First Amendment", 37 Creighton L. Rev. 579 (2004)
- "Judicial Supremacy and Its Discontents", 20 Const. Comm. 405 (2003)
- "Freedom of Expressive Association and Antidiscrimination Law After Dale: A Tripartite Approach", 85 Minn. L. Rev. 1515 (2001)
- "A Conservative Defense of Romer v. Evans", 76 Ind. L. J. 403 (2001)
- "Same-Sex Sexual Harassment Under Title VII", 37 S. Tex. L. Rev. 699 (1996)

== See also ==
- The Volokh Conspiracy
