= Braver Angels =

American nonprofit organization

- Motto: "Building a House United"
- Founders: David Blankenhorn, Bill Doherty, David Lapp
- Established: 2016
- Mission: "Bring Americans together to bridge the partisan divide and strengthen our democratic republic."
- President: David Blankenhorn
- Chair: Thomas K. Sylvester, General Counsel, Hedera
- Budget: $2.9 million
- Formerly called: Better Angels
- Address: 1330 Ave of the Americas; 23rd Floor; New York, NY 10019
- Website: braverangels.org

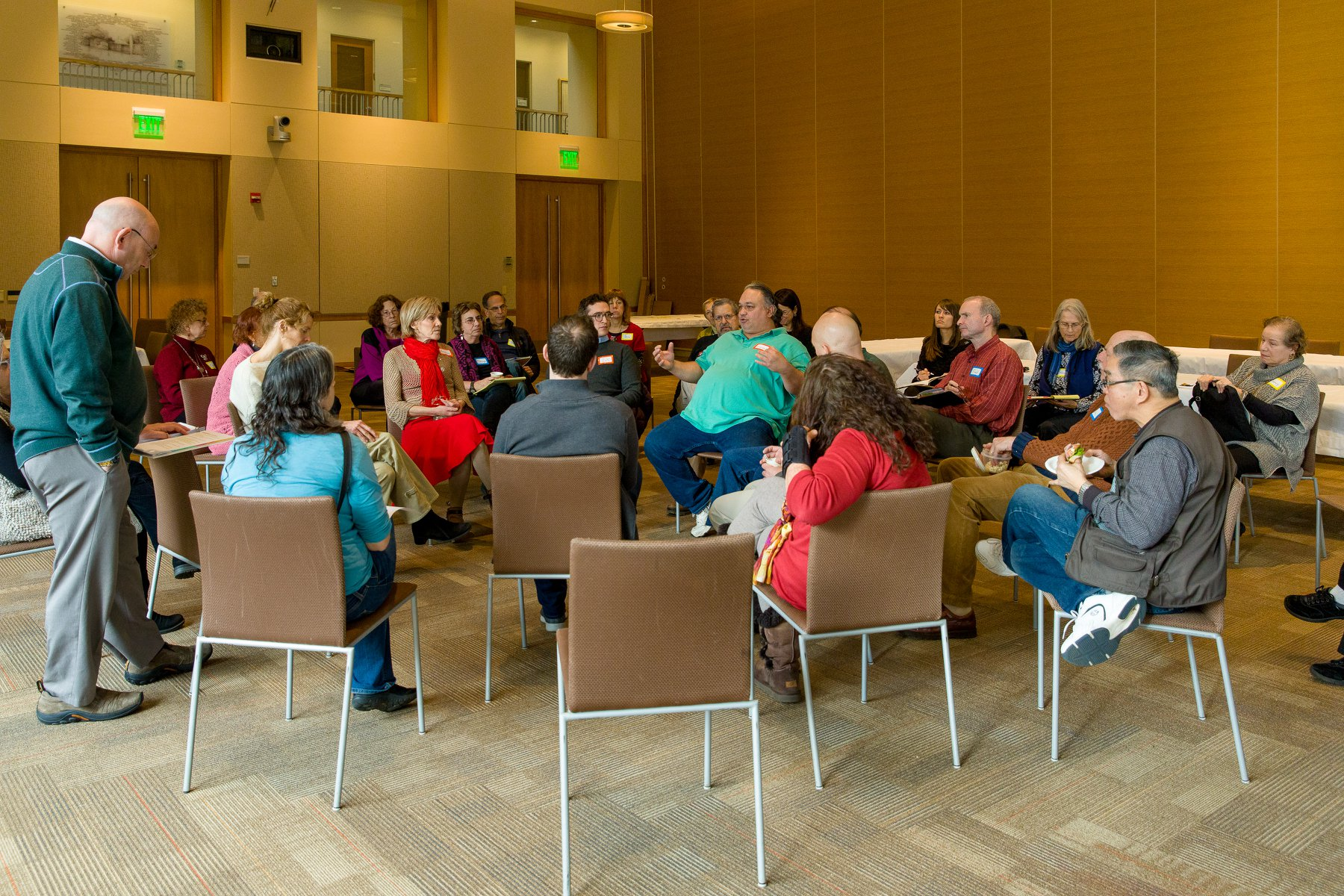
Fishbowl exercise at a 2018 Red/Blue workshop in Wellesley, Mass.

Braver Angels (formerly Better Angels) is a New York-based 501(c)(3) nonprofit dedicated to political depolarization. The organization runs workshops, debates, and other events where "red" (conservative) and "blue" (liberal) participants attempt to better understand one another's positions and discover their shared values.

The organization says it is the "largest, grassroots, bipartisan organization in America dedicated to reviving the communal spirit of American democracy" and that its "method involves bringing politically diverse people together in small groups to listen empathetically to each others' perspectives."

== Founding ==
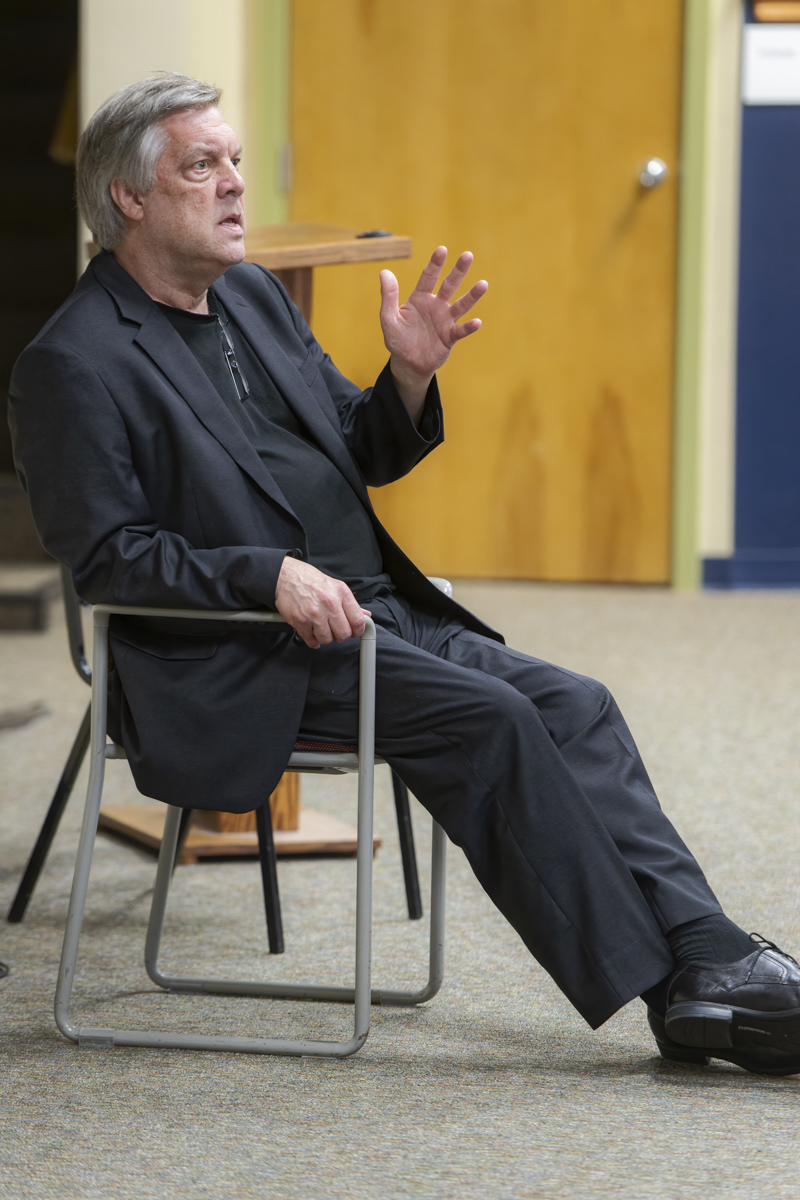
David Blankenhorn, a co-founder of Braver Angels, at their 2023 national convention

Braver Angels was founded by David Blankenhorn, Bill Doherty, and David Lapp shortly after the 2016 United States presidential election. The organization's original Better Angels name was inspired by Abraham Lincoln's plea for national unity at the close of his first inaugural address:

We must not be enemies. ... The mystic chords of memory ... will yet swell the chorus of the Union when again touched, as surely they will be, by the better angels of our nature.

The name was changed to Braver Angels in 2020 pursuant to a trademark infringement suit.

== National conventions ==
Braver Angels says it seeks to build a national movement and has sponsored conventions for its members across the United States since 2018. For its first convention, in June 2018, Braver Angels selected 72 conservative and 72 liberal delegates. The organization reported that over 100 delegates signed "An American Declaration." In the declaration, the signers claim to represent 3,100 members in calling for an end to political polarization and affirming "a shared faith that this land we love will again be touched by the better angels of our nature." The convention had musical performances by Peter Yarrow, Dana LaCroix, and Steve Seskin.

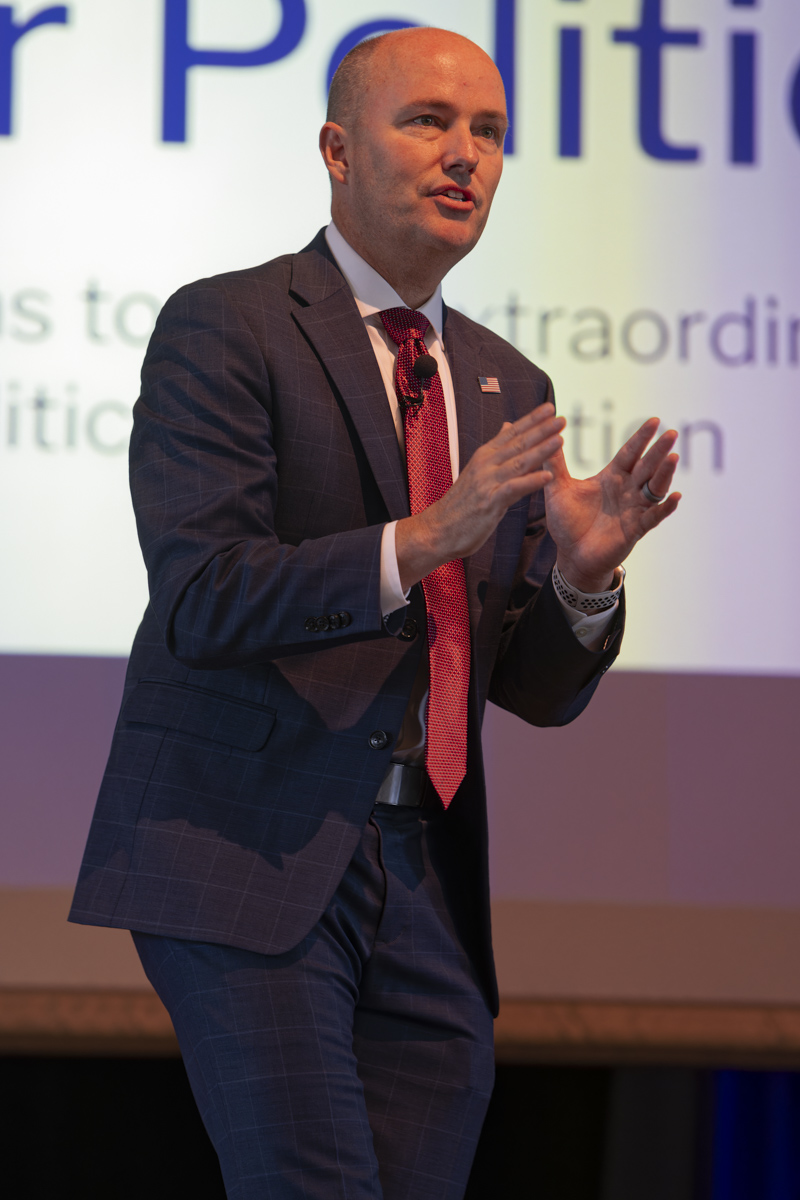
Utah Gov. Spencer Cox at the 2023 national convention of Braver Angels, Gettysburg PA.

The 2019 convention was held in St. Louis. The delegates passed a platform and heard from speakers, including leaders from Black Lives Matter NY and the Tea Party in Cincinnati. The 2020 convention, planned for Charlotte, NC, was canceled due to the COVID pandemic.

At its July 2023 convention in Gettysburg, a featured speaker was Utah Governor Spencer Cox, who created the National Governors Association's "Disagree Better" initiative. Gettysburg was chosen for its association with Abraham Lincoln, source of the "better angels" plea for national unity. The convention included music and political sketches. A performance by Gangstagrass began with a skit, with co-founder Bill Doherty in a barber's chair getting a haircut from a local barber. During the skit, Hawk Newsome of Black Lives Matter chided the audience for "snickering" he'd heard when he had talked about reparations.

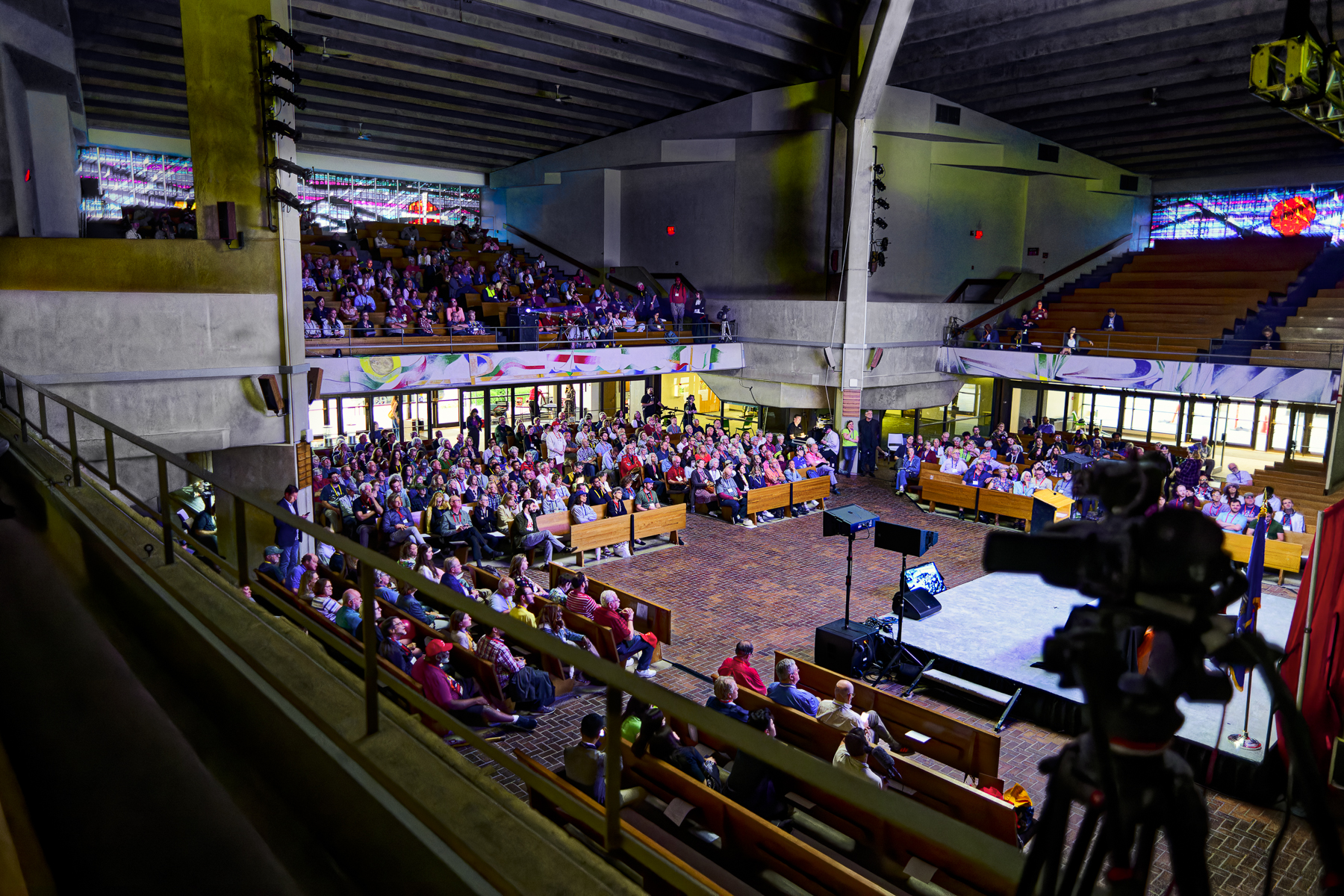
Watch party for the Biden-Trump debate, Braver Angels National Convention, June 27, 2024

The 2024 Braver Angels national convention was held on June 27–29 in Kenosha, Wisconsin. The program focused on four issues: "Abortion, Economic Inequality / Economic Growth, Free Speech / Hate Speech, and Immigration." Featured speakers included Jay Bhattacharya, Batya Ungar-Sargon, Jonathan Rauch, and Monica Harris of the Foundation Against Intolerance and Racism. Besides political discussions, the convention schedule included music and theater: The New York Theatre Workshop recruited local youth for a performance. On the first night, Braver Angels had a watch party for the Biden-Trump presidential debate. Braver Angels believes its debate watch party was the largest in the U.S.

== Workshops and debates ==
As its main activity, Braver Angels runs conversations among Americans with opposing political views. Its flagship discussion format has been the Red/Blue workshops. These are designed to facilitate understanding and conversations between conservative Reds and liberal Blues. Ideally, the number of Red and Blue participants is equal at each session. The workshop was designed by Braver Angels co-founder William Doherty, an expert in family social science at the University of Minnesota, based on methods used in couples' counseling. In a chapter for a book published by the American Psychological Association, Doherty "describes the origin and development of Braver Angels, with special attention to the workshops it offers, its initial impact. It connects some key decisions in the outreach of Braver Angels to citizen therapist principles."

Doherty's pilot effort was in December 2016, with weekend workshop in Ohio for 10 Clinton and 10 Trump supporters. The workshop principles are similar to those for married clients: "Speak for yourself; don't interpret what's going on in the other person's mind. Accept your own contribution to the problem—and that you can only change yourself. Focus on what you have in common: the shared history, goals, aspirations and values."

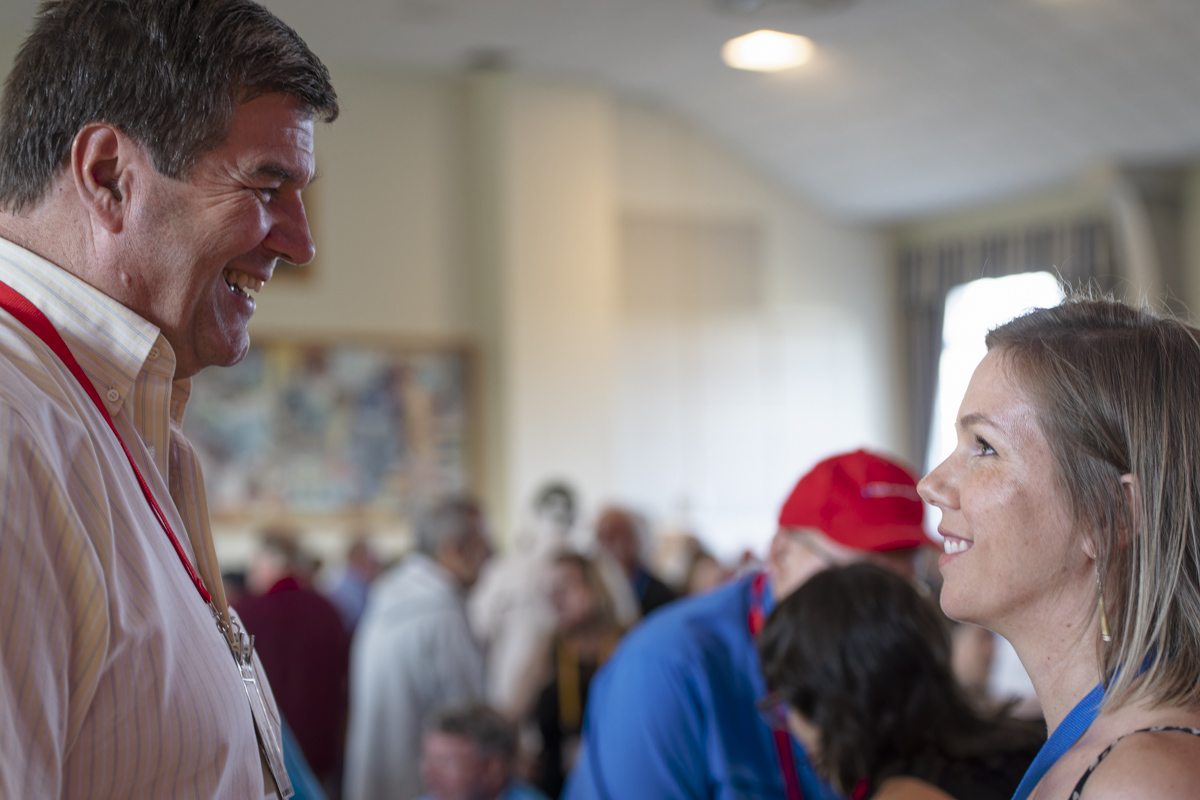
At Braver Angels workshops and conventions, participants wear red or blue to indicate their political stance as leaning conservative or liberal.

In a typical format, the workshop starts with each color-coded group identifying the stereotypes of their group. They then share these with the other group. The stereotyping exercise is followed by one or more additional exercises: the fishbowl, where one group does all the talking while the other group forms a circle around them to listen; the questions exercise, where mixed Red/Blue groups discuss their answers to questions that had been generated by each (Red or Blue) group; and the "How Can We Contribute" exercise, whereby red- and blue-identified participants are paired up and share in response to a multi-faceted prompt: "What can each of us do individually, what can our side do, and what might both sides do together to promote better understanding of differences and search for common ground?"

By April 2022, the organization had conducted "nearly 1,600 Red/Blue Workshops and 275 structured debates in all 50 states." The debates reportedly were shown to more than 15,000 people, with such speakers as former Ohio Governor Ted Strickland, author Andrew Sullivan, and former House Majority Leader Dick Gephardt.

Braver Angels also offers "Braver Seminars", publishes works ("Braver Angels Publishing"), and convenes scholars and public intellectuals.

The group also created a "Skills for Bridging the Divide" workshop. In a 2.5-hour format, the workshop aims to convey information about meaningful, non-polarizing discussions, give participants some hands-on practice, and to convince people to do such bridge-building. This training covered three key listening skills—paraphrasing, clarifying and acknowledging (or agreeing)—and its speaking skills include pivoting to introduce a divergent viewpoint and offering one's own viewpoint, including "I statements" and expressions of concern. The training also cautions against pitfalls and counterproductive behavior.

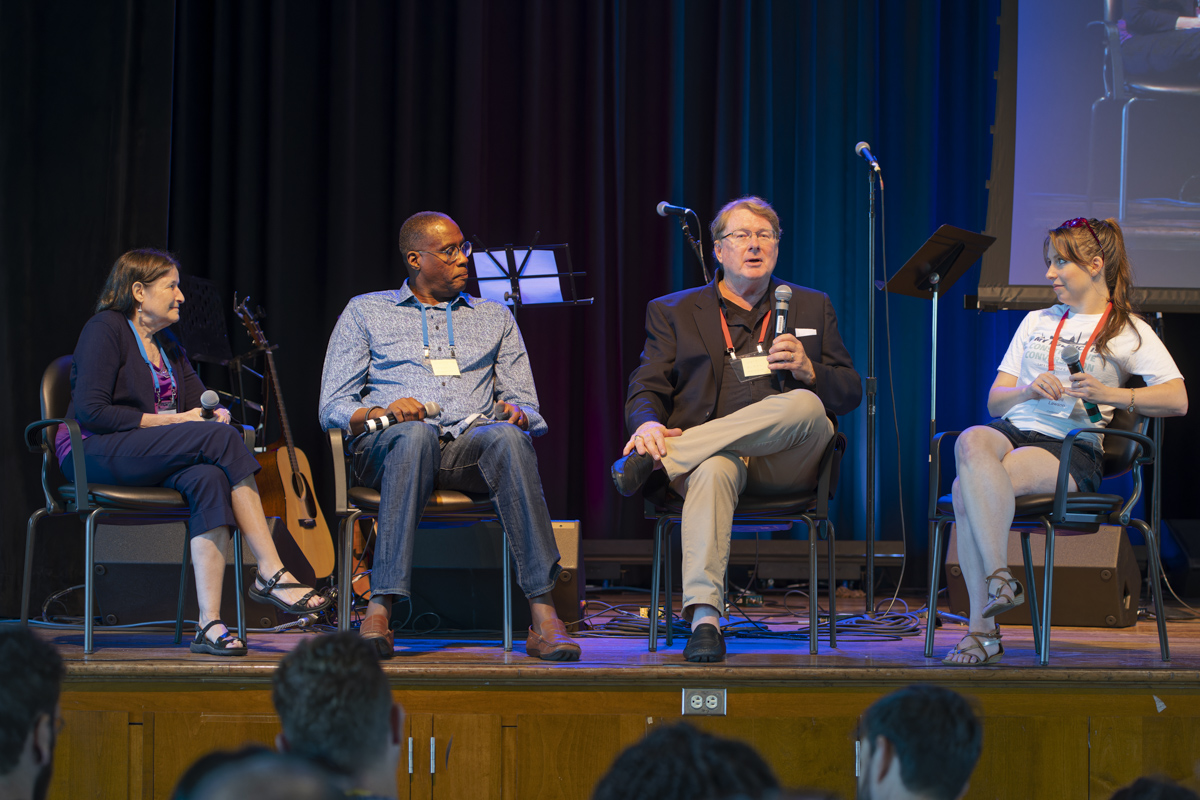
Presentation by the "Trustworthy Elections" team at the 2023 Braver Angels Convention in Gettyburg, PA

In the wake of the 2020 election, Braver Angels conducted 26 "Trustworthy Elections" workshops, guided by a national task force, and issued a report. The report highlighted three principles: "Voting should be easy. Cheating should be hard"; "Every citizen should have an equal say in who will govern them; this is done through free and fair elections"; and "The American government will fail if candidates refuse to accept any outcome other than victory." The report made 26 recommendations in seven areas, including gerrymandering, voting access, vote counting, voter identification, and "peaceful transition of power."

== Organization ==
David Blankenhorn is the president of Braver Angels. He formerly worked to uphold same-sex marriage bans; in 2012, he announced that he continues to believe same-sex marriage is wrong but supports its legalization as a political compromise. John Wood Jr. produces the Braver Angels podcast and YouTube channel. He is a Republican politician in Los Angeles County. The board of directors includes Blankenhorn, social psychologist and author Jonathan Haidt, and Glenn Stanton of Focus on the Family.

Braver Angels participants are mostly white, college-educated, and older. While conventions and many workshops are designed for balanced representation, the organization reported that across its 2021 events, self-identified Democrats significantly outnumbered Republicans. In 2022, the organization's expenses were $2.9 million, mainly for "Bridging social divides" and public outreach, with yearend net assets of $1.4 million.

Although Braver Angels does not track its members' religiosity, Christian communities have played a significant role in the organization. For example, in 2018, churches in Florida requested, sponsored, and hosted Braver Angels events. In 2020, "Malice Toward None" was a Braver Angels initiative aimed at reducing partisan animosity within religious communities. In advance of its 2024 Convention, the Latter Day Saints Magazine promoted a local conversation series and registered delegates for the convention. An LDS church elder was a featured speaker at the 2023 convention.

== Podcast and publications ==
The Braver Angels Podcast began in 2017, hosted by a rotating group of Braver Angels leaders including David Blankenhorn, John Wood Jr., Alma Cook, April Lawson Kornfield, Ciaran O'Connor, and Mónica Guzmán. Guests have included Bill Kristol, James Comey, Scott Adams, Jonathan Haidt, Coleman Hughes, Hawk Newsome, Carol M. Swain, and Greta Van Susteren. The group's website also showcases episodes of a podcast by John Wood Jr. with Bertrand Cooper and Dennis Prager.

The group's website promotes a 50-minute documentary about an April 2017 Red/Blue workshop in Waynesville, Ohio, titled Better Angels: Reuniting America. It was produced by Peter Yarrow and directed by Jim Brown.

Braver Angels leaders have published books about their efforts, including Blankenhorn's In Search of Braver Angels and Guzman's I Never Thought of it That Way: How to Have Fearlessly Curious Conversations in Dangerously Divided Times. (There are also books that highlight Braver Angels, such as Bomey's Bridge builders: bringing people together in a polarized age.)

== Collaborations ==
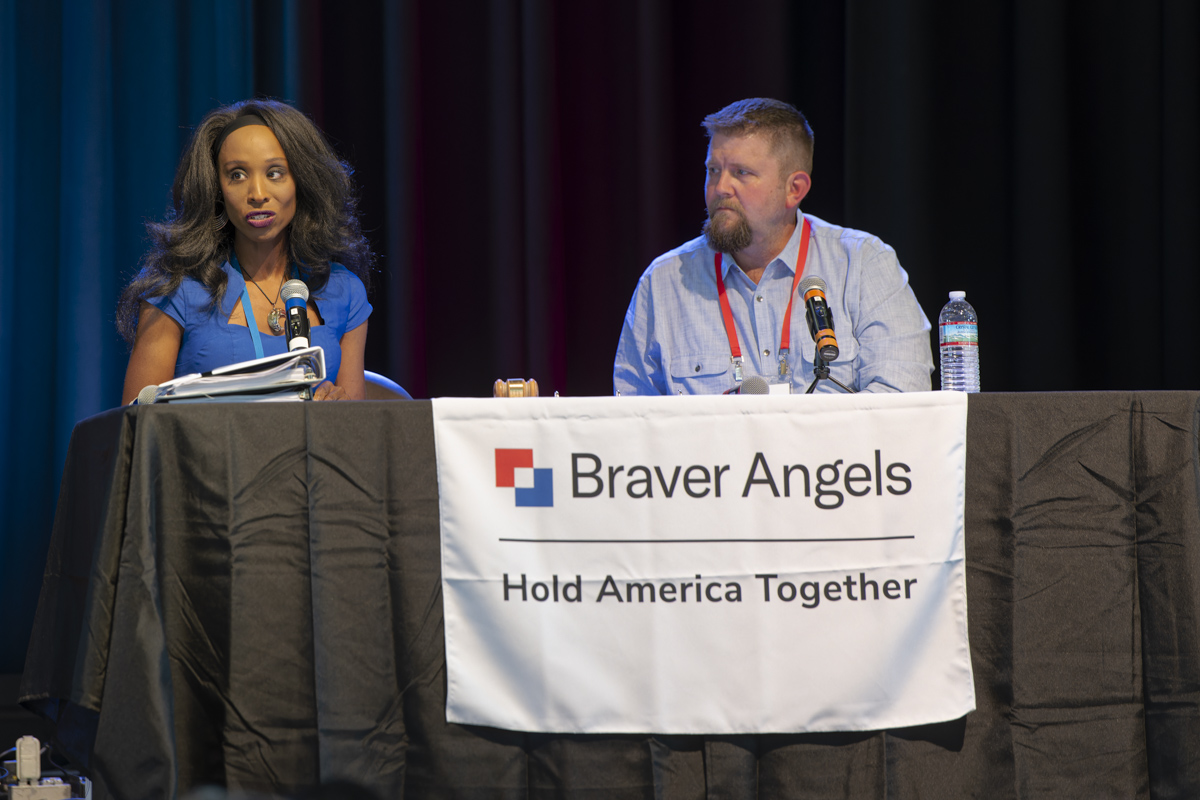
Convention speakers included Erica Manuel of the Institute for Local Government, a collaborating partner with Braver Angels. July 2023

Braver Angels has pursued collaboration with other organizations geared to civic discourse. Notably, it set up the "Braver Network", which lists dozens of loosely affiliated organizations. The network is co-chaired by Bridge USA, Institute for Local Government, and StoryCorps. For example, StoryCorps lists the Braver Angels' 1:1 conversations among its One Small Step recommendations.

The American Council of Trustees and Alumni (ACTA) has sponsored about 200 Braver Angels debates on more than 75 college campuses, on many topics, with support from Braver Angels and BridgeUSA. At the local level, Braver Angels developed alliances and interest groups, including a music community, a film club, a book club, technology lab, equality caucus, and faith caucus.

On occasion, media organizations have explicitly supported workshops, such as the USA Today Ohio Network publicizing Braver Angels workshop after the 2020 elections.

In another collaboration, Braver Angels adapted its "Skills for Bridging the Divide" workshop for a national climate advocacy organization. After a pilot run, Braver Angels ran eight online workshops for 403 participants. The participants said that, by a large margin, they improved their ability to set a constructive tone in difficult conversations and to "listen to people on the other side in a way that they felt heard." But it was conceded that the participants' demographics were not representative, i.e., older, female, white, and liberal, and conversations with political conservatives or those who disputed climate change solution were not studied.

== Political engagement ==
Braver Angels defines itself a "nonpartisan group whose mission is to study and strengthen civil society" with a focus on reducing polarization. Within this scope, its "Braver Politics" activities include skill workshops for candidates and elected officials, candidate debates, "neighborhood conversations," and "town halls" with political candidates. It also offers its flagship Red/Blue workshops for elected officials or their staff.

For example, Braver Angels ran workshops for mayors in Minnesota, county commissioners in North Carolina, election day officials in New Hampshire, and 60 members of the U.S. House of Representatives "Problem Solving Caucus."

Braver Angels provides its own certificate for its skills workshops for elected officials.

== Scholarship on Braver Angels ==
Scholars who doubt that Braver Angels can actually reduce polarization include psychologist Peter Coleman. Coleman argues that animosity between groups is stronger than a single workshop can change: "Just meeting with other people, particularly once for a short period of time, is insufficient to changing people's attitudes, habits, the media they watch, the internet that they serve."

Alex Zamalin, author of Against Civility, The Hidden Racism in Our Obsession with Civility, argues that Braver Angels deals only with civic politeness and thus does not address the power dynamics needed for political change.

Of Braver Angels' workshops, "Red/Blue workshops" have received the most scholarly investigation. They have been characterized as "reciprocal group reflection." Scholarship on Braver Angels has included an examination of its meetings as artistic performances and as comparable to religious teachings, such as those dealing with reconciliation and creating opportunities to "listen attentively and empathetically to authentic concerns."

Scholars have also begun to investigate the effects of Braver Angels on political polarization. One study, which had undergraduate college students participate in Red/Blue workshops, found that "that depolarization is especially effective when it includes both informational and emotional components, such that citizens who are moved to empathize with outgroup members become more likely to internalize new information about them." One study found that Red/Blue workshop participants learned to get along with each other, understand each other's positions, and identify points of common interest, and improved their skills in relating across political differences.

Sociologist James Cavendish believes that religious groups should use the Braver Angels model, among others, to counter polarization in America and build more robust social relationships, regardless of political antagonism.
