= Civility =

Polite act or expression

Civility may denote orderly behavior and politeness. Historically, civility also meant training in the humanities.

== Definition ==
Civility has been described as among the most valuable of the social virtues. In this context it has been described as the skill of discussing topics that are important to one with others who disagree with and do so without any serious falling out. An alternative meaning of the term Civility is to describe the some limits on acceptable behaviour. In this sense it can reflect a problematic society one in which rights such as equality or humanity are extended only to those who are deemed to be sufficiently civil. These are two extreme positions between which are range of different views and approaches to Civility have been argued. Civility is an idea that many philosophers especially after The Reformation when rival approaches to the seeking of salvation appeared to make disagreement difficult if civility was to be maintained.

Key early works on civility include:

- Baldassare Castiglione's 1528 The Book of the Courtier
- Erasmus's 1530 On Civility in Children

== Developmental model ==
Adolf G. Gundersen and Suzanne Goodney Lea developed a civility model grounded in empirical data that "stresses the notion that civility is a sequence, not a single thing or set of things". The model conceives of civility as a continuum or scale consisting of increasingly demanding traits ranging from "indifference" to "commentary", "conversation", "co-exploration" and, from there, to "habituation". According to the authors, such a developmental model has several advantages, not least of which is that it allows civility to be viewed as something everyone can get better at.

== Empathy in civility ==
Many civility experts say civility goes beyond good manners and listening attentively, but includes sharing our own beliefs and values with others through some type of engagement with the intent of sincere respect towards one another. This also requires a willingness and open mindedness to having our opinions and biases challenged by others who share different and perhaps unique points of view.

Civility experts say that our ability to act with civility is connected with our ability to understand our own emotions. Understanding our feelings helps us to recognize how we are feeling in real-time and give us a greater ability to have empathy for others. Furthermore, discerning and recognizing our feelings can help us to evaluate the things that trigger us emotionally and therefore become more aware of how we will possibly react and feel in certain situations. By taking the time to understand our thoughts and emotions in these situations, this practice can lead to self-recognition and acceptance of how similar situations may affect others, including those that may share a unique perspective.

Sharon Styles-Anderson established Emotional Civility Day, March 6. Emotional Civility, a concept developed by Anderson, helps the world recognize that there is a connection between the way people feel and the way they interact with others.

== Lack of civility ==
Incivility is the opposite of civility—a lack of civility. Verbal or physical attacks on others, cyber bullying, rudeness, religious intolerance, discrimination, and vandalism are some of the acts that are generally considered uncivil. Incivility is an issue on the global stage. Social media and the web give people the ability to freely exchange ideas, but this has not come without consequences.

Politicians in the U.S. frequently say that they encounter a lack of civility in their workplace, and have disregarded it as unfortunate aspect of politics. But polls indicate that "going negative" can help candidates win elections. During the 2016 presidential campaign, candidate Donald Trump regularly called his rivals "stupid, incompetent, and losers," while his opponent Hillary Clinton referred to his voters as a "basket of deplorables."

Recognizing that people harassing others online has become a problem and can have negative consequences for businesses, many companies stepped up to create more awareness and initiatives to help. Intel in collaboration with organizations such as the Born This Way Foundation and Vox Media initiated "Hack Harassment" aimed to increase awareness of online harassment and anti-harassment technologies. As of 2016 the Data & Society/CiPHR Measuring Cyberabuse poll indicated that nearly 70% of people between the ages of 15 and 29 are harassed or abused online. Although there are tactics to block cyber-bullying, such as censorship and banning users from accessing a site, it does not correct the underlying issues on what causes it. 75% of technology professionals believe a universal code of online conduct would also help curb online harassment.

On April 22, 2016, The Associated Press-NORC Center for Public Affairs Research at the University of Chicago released a report citing that 74 percent of Americans think manners and behavior have declined in the United States. In this study they discovered that people in most cases can agree with what is appropriate and inappropriate behavior. They found that 8 out of 10 Americans find jokes made based on race, gender, or sexuality are considered inappropriate, but only a small number of people own up to making these types of jokes. The report suggests that nearly half of all Americans aged 18–29 find it acceptable to use their cell phones in a restaurant, while fewer than 22 percent of people over the age of 60 agree.

== Critiques of civility in politics ==
Although calls for civility are made by politicians across political parties and ideologies, some scholars question whether political civility and resistance to incivility can lead to harmful consequences. Alex Zamalin argues that criticism of uncivil political discourse can detract attention from the substance of peoples' views by centering discussion of the tone with which ideas are delivered rather than their content. Additionally, rhetorical critics Nina Lozano-Reich and Dana Cloud observe that dominant groups have historically used appeals for civility in politics to silence and marginalize historically oppressed groups. As an example, Lozano-Reich and Cloud point out that, in the late nineteenth and early twentieth centuries, notions of "civilization" and "civility" were used to justify the exclusion of women from the public sphere. Jasbir Puar also notes that historically oppressed groups such as people of color and immigrants are more likely to be regarded as uncivil because of discriminatory ideas about these groups. These dynamics are further complicated by societal elites having greater power than marginalized groups in defining what counts as civil versus uncivil. Thus, as Lozano-Reich and Cloud argue, political equality among different social groups is likely required for both civil discourse and appeals for civil discourse to yield productive dialogue that does not marginalize members of historically oppressed groups.

== Movements to foster civility ==
=== Worldwide ===
In October 2019, the United Nations announced that the World Civility Index would be a part of their Sustainable Development Goals (SDGs). The new Sustainable Development Goals initiative serves as the updated global targets that were set forth initially in the Millennium Development Goals (MDGs) of 2000 to 2015. Under the Sustainable Development Goals initiatives, the United Nations identified seventeen core challenges that have an interconnected part in achieving a more sustainable future for all. The World Civility Index is designed to be implemented as a tool for employers and organizations around the world to create a system of consistent measurements of soft skills that are related to civility. Other global organizations, such as the Worldwide Civility Council, also aim to centralize civility resources and tools, such as the Civility Scorecard and Masonic Family Civility Project, in order to help promote civility and assist various civility organizations around the world. One of the core ideas promoted by the United Nations' goal on achieving worldwide civility is having a universal system for measuring civility, because setting a standard of measurement helps to more accurately measure levels of civility. Furthermore, having meaningful measurements will help in creating more effective and efficient training to assist people in acquiring the soft skills needed, such as civility, in the modern workplace and foreseeable future.

In 2020, the Worldwide Civility Council launched the Certified Civil initiative to recognize the commitment to civil behavior and communication by individuals, organizations, and groups around the world, which also includes but is not limited to businesses, publications, websites, and social media sites. A Certified Civil designation can only be awarded based on a demonstrated ability to act and foster civility. At the core of the civility certification process are several commitments, including advocating for dignity and respect in all dealings, listening to create constructive dialogues, speaking in a manner that reflects respect, ensuring all public content is within bounds defined by the Certified Civil standards, displaying the Certified Civil logo, and maintaining good standing through continuous certification.

=== In the United States ===
==== Opinion polls ====
A 2010 Allegheny College poll found that nearly all Americans (95 percent) believe civility is important in politics.

In a 2012 poll conducted by Weber Shandwick, 65% of Americans reported an increase in incivility due to a weakened U.S. economy during the Great Recession. Almost 50% of those Americans indicated they have removed themselves from participating in politics because of fear of incivility or bullying. Of the 1000 people surveyed, a follow-up study revealed that 86% of those people reported being subjected to incivility. In this report, part of an annual follow-up research report in January 2016 sharing findings on attitudes and sentiment about civility, 95% of Americans believe that incivility is a very visible issue, while 74% recognized that civility in general had declined during the past few years. Over 90% of voters claimed that the presidential candidates' attitudes and civil behavior would play a significant role in their voting decision in the upcoming 2016 election.

In poll conducted by Georgetown University in 2019, 88% of Americans polled expressed concern and frustration about uncivil and rude behavior of many politicians. 87% said they are "tired of leaders compromising their values and ideals, while 80% of those same Americans want both "compromise and common ground" as well as leaders who "will stand up for the other side".

==== In the legal profession ====
Penn State University conducted a study on perceptions of the legal profession and its relation to civility. They found that general opinion pointed to a drop in civility within the legal profession. To counteract demeaning and unprofessional behavior, there have been several initiatives put in place by state bar associations. However, the legal profession is not the only industry that has adopted civility standards. Many other companies and organizations across several industries have adopted civility standards that also help to increase workplace civility.

==== In schools ====
Numerous universities in the U.S., such as the University of Colorado, the University of Missouri, University of California Davis, Johns Hopkins University, University of Wisconsin, Rutgers University, American University, and California State University San Marcos have created programs designed to foster and define what civility means on their campuses. The Center on Civility & Democratic Engagement at University of California, Berkeley's Goldman School of Public Policy recognizes that public dialogue often lacks civility and focuses on preparing leaders to successfully engage people of diverse perspectives in finding solutions for pressing public policy issues. Some colleges, such as the Arizona State University, offer an undergraduate certificate in Civil Communication. Other universities, such as Kansas State University, developed programs in dialogue and deliberation which involve codes of behavior that foster constructive, civil discourse. Although many colleges have adopted programs to foster civility efforts, there are still many colleges and universities, including many of the Ivy League schools, that do not have or list no visible place online about any civility initiatives, codes or standards.

==== In the community ====
Numerous community groups have formed in the U.S. to restore constructive civility in the public space. The Civility Toolkit with approximately 300 civility tools aggregated by the Civility Center provides access to resources regarding civility to help restore civility in society. Many of these groups are members of the National Coalition for Dialogue and Deliberation.

Arnett and Arneson define civility as "a metaphor that points to the importance of public respect in interpersonal interaction." The difference between tolerating someone and respecting them is that toleration does not imply respect, but respect requires understanding of another person's perspective. Having social intelligence or "Social IQ" impacts our ability to empathize with people, and realize all people are human and that if respect or common ground cannot be met that we strive for at least toleration in order to be civil.

In Psychology Today, Price-Mitchell describes civility as a personal attitude that acknowledges other humans' rights to live and coexist together in a manner that does not harm others. The psychology of civility indicates awareness, ability to control one's passions, as well as have a deeper understanding of others. This may suggest that civility goes beyond mere toleration, but may imply a mutual co-existence and respect for humankind.

In the academic journal Philosophy & Public Affairs, Calhoun delineates civility as an element of dialogue that sheds light on "basic moral attitudes of respect, tolerance, and considerateness". Calhoun considers civility to be one of the moral virtues that can differ from what is socially acceptable, since what is socially acceptable is not always morally correct.

In the Washington Post, Peter Wehner, author and former deputy director of speechwriting for President George W. Bush, expressed three central points on how civility makes society function and noble. The first of these points illustrates that civility is what holds our families, communities, conversations, and establishments together. Civility enables civic cohesion and eliminates excuses for invective conversations or conflict. Wehner's second point suggests that civility is also an expression of a work of divine art and respect for all human beings. In some ways this mirrors the words written in the United States Declaration of Independence on Life, Liberty and the pursuit of Happiness in that all people are worthy of the inherent and unalienable respect of human dignity. The third point made by Wehner is that civility is an expression of epistemological humility where truth is not relative, but suggests that truth can cover a more widely spread understanding than what is preconceived or imagined.

The Smithsonian coordinated with Olúfémi O. Táíwò, assistant professor of political philosophy and ethics at Georgetown University, to discuss the important role that civility has played in the pursuit of social justice. The presentation outlined that civility seemed to have declined in recent years by increasing political and social polarization coupled with simplistic mass communication systems. Additionally, Táíwò examines social norms, such as the formal female adult address of calling a woman "Ms.", as well as emerging norms of social etiquette that could encourage people to think and ask others about their pronouns. Hosting community events around civility can lead to interesting conversations and can broaden perspectives, and as Táíwò points out, civility will continue to play an important role in how justice for all will be shaped in the future.

==== Masons and civility ====
The Freemasons and members of the Masonic family have had a long history of fostering civil dialogue and building civil societies. Masonic Lodges represent a peaceful assembly of people that are of different places of origin, languages, backgrounds, and beliefs. The principles and tenets of Freemasonry aim to promote and restore civility in the United States and around the globe. In 2015, Grand Master Charvonia of the Grand Lodge of California declared May 25, 2015 to be the "Champion Civility Month", which encouraged Freemasons throughout California to make an effort to bring more civility into their local lodges and community. Additionally, Freemasons from around the world have been working to repair civility through the Masonic Family Civility Project. This Civility Project was built to help raise awareness of civility, by providing social conversations, civility resources, multimedia education, and information for anyone to access.

From April 30 to May 1 of 2019, an Urgency of Civility Conference was hosted in Washington D.C. at the George Washington Masonic National Memorial. Civility experts convened to discuss civility in arenas of government, education, media, community, and the workplace. During the conference, Congressman Emanuel Cleaver II made a presentation in recognition of Virginia Forni and her late husband, P.M. Forni, for their efforts on the Johns Hopkins Civility Initiative. Advocates of civility shared their thoughts, ideas, and efforts to promote civility in various sectors. Attendees worked together to form action items required to help further civility initiatives, including innovative thinking, engaging the community, and maintaining steadfast persistence.

==== In the workplace ====
Studies and polls from 2014 indicate that Americans find workplace incivility to be a growing problem that has a negative impact on them and their duties at work. One study suggests 60% of employees think that their co-workers' irritating habits have negatively affected them at their job. In the same study, 40% reported that they are looking for another job opportunity because of a negative co-worker. These studies suggest that incivility in the workplace dampens productivity and has an adverse effect on an organization's bottom line. This data does not account for how many people encounter workplace incivility and are not sure what they can do about it. Furthermore, it does not take into consideration how many of these workplaces have civility tools or initiatives.

Various organizations, including the United States government, have taken steps to prevent incivility at work. One strategy is addressing sexual harassment cases, which the US Equal Employment Opportunity Commission (EEOC) defines as unlawful in all states. This involves preventing gender-based mistreatment during employment or hiring. Harassment encompasses "sexual harassment" as well as workplace bullying, cyberbullying, and threats. Although sexual harassment's illegality is widely accepted, it gained significant attention in the U.S. starting in 1964. In the past, unclear legal boundaries resulted in more people experiencing unwanted behavior due to legal ambiguity. The term's clearer definition has enhanced workplace protection, but individuals need to actively contribute by speaking up and reporting incidents.

==== Organizational behavior ====
Human resource managers are aware of the effects of social behavior in the workplace. Inappropriate workplace behavior has led HR personnel to pay more attention to problems arising from incivility, bullying, and abusive supervision within organizations. Research concluded that incivility can have a negative impact of organizational behavior, including: decreased satisfaction, reduced job performance, increased perceptions of injustice, increased depression, and can lead to employees to experience psychological withdrawal.

Organizations are improving their workplaces by reducing incident rates and limiting liability. Some companies offer employees civility training specifically geared to foster civility by facilitating conversations about it. Research indicates that civility training shows a positive increase in respect, job satisfaction, and overall trust, while effects of incivility, cynicism, and employee absenteeism decreased. The results suggest civility training can improve the workplace climate, foster a culture of positive behaviors, and minimize workplace issues.

=== In Canada ===
In July 2012, the President of the Federation of Law Societies of Canada addressed civility at the 5th Biennial International Legal Ethics Conference. In 2012, the Law Society of Upper Canada decided that Joe Groia was guilty of incivility to opposing counsel during his successful defense of John Felderhof on Insider trading and securities charges. On the same case, the Supreme Court of Canada confirmed the decision of Bar of Quebec that Giles Dore was guilty of professional misconduct because of an uncivil letter he wrote to a judge. This high-profile case brought a lot of attention to the legal definition of the word civility, and what it means to be civil in the legal profession. It has since defined a broader set of rules of what is legally considered civil in the court of law in Canada.

Since the Groia case, The Law Society of Upper Canada launched several initiatives to guard against incivility in the Canadian legal profession. To enforce its stance on civility in the Canadian legal system, they issued verbal warnings to lawyers who are not civil with judges and other lawyers. The counter argument against civility measures is that the new guidelines may inhibit their ability to defend their clients.

In January 2017, the B.C. & Yukon Freemasons in Canada stated civility was like The Golden Rule: "treating others as you would want them to treat you". This statement was in part to a recent civility initiative.

=== In New Zealand ===
At a recent address with Gisborne's top businesswomen in early 2016, Lara Meyer, an adviser to the Australian Government, cited incivility in the workplace has cost New Zealand approximately NZ$15 million a year. Noting that Australia is also losing out about NZ$26 million a year due to a lack of workplace civility. There could potentially be more loss that is unaccounted for in New Zealand businesses, as the cost of rudeness could be holding them back from working together more politely and agreeably.

== Famous quotes on civility ==
- "So let us begin anew—remembering on both sides that civility is not a sign of weakness, and sincerity is always subject to proof. Let us never negotiate out of fear. But let us never fear to negotiate." ―John F. Kennedy
- "Civility does not here mean the mere outward gentleness of speech cultivated for the occasion, but an inborn gentleness and desire to do the opponent good." ―Mohandas K. Gandhi
- "Civility costs nothing and buys you everything." ―Lady Mary Wortley Montagu
- "If a man continually blusters, if he lacks civility, a big stick will not save him from trouble, and neither will speaking softly avail, if back of the softness there does not lie strength, power." ―Theodore Roosevelt
- "Civility also requires relearning how to disagree without being disagreeable... surely you can question my policies without questioning my faith." ―Barack Obama

== See also ==
- Etiquette – Customary code of polite behaviour
- Incivility – Social behaviour lacking in civility or good manners
- Civilizing mission
