= H-bar =

H-bar or h-bar can refer to:

- H with stroke, a Latin letter H with a doubled horizontal stroke (Ħ ħ)
  - Voiceless pharyngeal fricative, represented in IPA by ⟨ħ⟩
- Reduced Planck constant, in which the above symbol represents as a mathematical symbol, ħ = h/2π
- Antihydrogen, an antimatter element represented by the symbol H̅
- Steyr AUG HBAR, a light machine gun version of the AUG assault rifle
- Multirests, indicated in musical notation through H-bars
- HBAR cryptocurrency, for Hedera Hashgraph's public distributed ledger

== See also ==
- Horizontal bar
- Dash § Horizontal bar
- Maltese alphabet
