= Middleton Grange School =

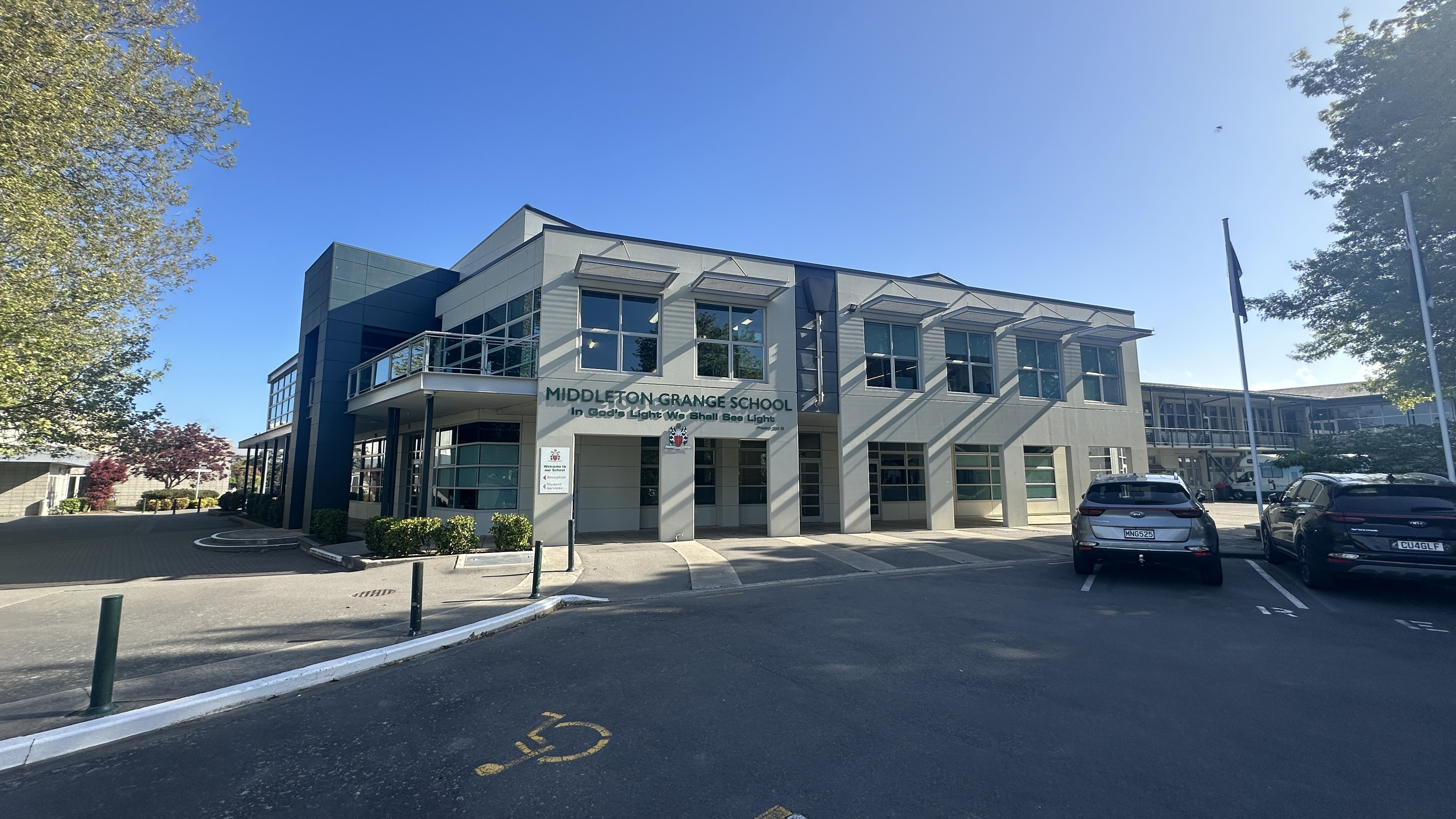
- Middleton Grange School in 2024

Location
- 30 Acacia Avenue; Upper Riccarton; Christchurch 8041; New Zealand; 43.5369°S 172.5760°E

Information
- Type: State Integrated Composite(Years 1–13)
- Motto: In thy light shall we see light
- Established: 1964
- Ministry of Education Institution no.: 335
- Principal: Mike Vannoort
- Enrolment: 1,385 (July 2026)
- Socio-economic decile: 9Q
- Website: middleton.school.nz

Middleton Grange School (abbreviated MGS) in Christchurch, New Zealand, is a state-integrated Christian co-educational Year 1 to 13 school. It's currently New Zealand's largest evangelical Christian school.

== History ==
Established in 1964 by the Christian Schools Trust, as an independent Christian school and became integrated into the state system in 1996.

Middleton Grange School belongs to the Christchurch Christian Schools Network (CSN) and the New Zealand Association for Christian Schools (NZACS).

The school premises used to house the Christchurch headquarters of the Maxim Institute, a conservative Christian thinktank. Bruce Logan was once Middleton Grange's former curriculum director.

In 2010, the school was ordered to apologise and compensate a former employee for firing him because of his homosexuality.

In 2018, the school held a mufti day for a gold coin donation called 'dress as refugees' to support World Vision. The school asked students to dress as refuges in old ragged cloths. The former principal Richard Vanderpyl said that the mufti say was a good way to develop understanding and compassion is to experience a little bit of what it feels like to be poor. The school received two complaints from parents due to the mufti day.

== Structure ==
Middleton Grange School's academic structure consists of four departments, Primary School, Middle School, Senior College and International College.

Primary School consists of students from years 1–6, Middle School consists of students from years 7–10 and Senior College consists of students from years 11–13.

Primary School, Middle School and Senior College all have separate heads. The Head of Primary School is Christine Buckley, the Head of Middle School is Anne Mackechnie, and the Head of Senior College is Shane McConnell.

Years 7–13 all have Deans or Learning Team Leaders for each year. The current principal is Gregg Le Roux.

== Enrolment ==
As of July 2026, Middleton Grange School has a roll of 1,385 students, of which 88 (6.4%) identify as Māori.

As of 2026, the school has an Equity Index of 404, placing it amongst schools whose students have few socioeconomic barriers to achievement (roughly equivalent to deciles 8 and 9 under the former socio-economic decile system).

== Academics ==
As a state-integrated school, Middleton Grange follows the New Zealand Curriculum (NZC). In Years 11 to 13, students complete the National Certificate of Educational Achievement (NCEA), the main secondary school qualification in New Zealand

== Houses ==
Pupils and teachers are divided into specific houses which then compete in (mostly) sporting and cultural activities. There are four of these, named after early British explorers of Antarctica, as Robert Falcon Scott stayed at Middleton Grange's original gentry house before embarking on his ill-fated expedition.

Middleton Grange House Names & their Colours
Scott	Named after Robert Falcon Scott CVO (6 June 1868 – 29 March 1912), who was a British Royal Naval officer and explorer who led two expeditions to the Antarctic regions: the Discovery Expedition, 1901–04, and the ill-fated Terra Nova Expedition, 1910–13.
Wilson	Named after Dr Edward Adrian Wilson ("Uncle Bill") (23 July 1872 – 29 March 1912). He was a notable English polar explorer, physician, naturalist, painter and ornithologist.
Shackleton	Named after Sir Ernest Henry Shackleton CVO OBE, (15 February 1874 – 5 January 1922), an Anglo-Irish explorer who was one of the principal figures of the period known as the Heroic Age of Antarctic Exploration.
Bowen	Named after Sir Charles Bowen (1830 – 12 December 1917). He was a prominent mountaineer and explorer of the Andes, and a Christchurch City Council member.

== Notable alumni ==
- Graham Capill – Former leader, Christian Heritage, eldest son of Don Capill, First Middleton Grange Vice-Principal. Later convicted of sexual abuse.
- Jeremy Kench – Professional basketball player
- Marisa van der Meer – New Zealand footballer
- Josiah Tualamali’i – Health and social justice advocate
- Olivia Podmore – Professional racing cyclist
- Richie Edwards – Professional basketball player
- William Stedman – Paralympian silver medalist, World Championships gold medalist

== Notable staff ==
- Vic Pollard (Former Associate Principal)
- Bruce Logan (Former Curriculum Director)
