= Patrick Basham =

American academic

Patrick Basham is a former adjunct scholar and senior fellow of the Cato Institute, and the founding Director (in 2006) of the Democracy Institute. Basham was previously the founding director of the Social Affairs Centre at the Canadian Fraser Institute. He has published a number of books and contributed articles to a range of major US newspapers.

Basham studied political science at Carleton University, the University of Houston and University of Cambridge, earning B.A. and M.A. degrees from the former institutions. Basham has claimed he holds a PhD from the University of Cambridge; however, he withdrew from the university without gaining the qualification. Issues with his credentials and academic claims have been highlighted in The BMJ.

== Controversy ==
In December 2005 Basham wrote an article for the Washington Times which praised the Canadian Conservative Stephen Harper as "pro-free trade, pro-Iraq war, anti-Kyoto and socially conservative". Harper publicly objected, saying that the description "greatly oversimplifies my positions." Harper went on to form a minority government after the January 2006 election.

During the 2020 United States presidential election, Basham made comments supporting the Trump campaign's false claims of electoral fraud in an article he authored for the Daily Express, a middle-market British tabloid newspaper. Throughout the campaign, the Daily Express published polls commissioned with Basham's Democracy Institute showing that Trump would win with a landslide victory.

== Books ==
- Butt Out! How Philip Morris Burned Ted Kennedy, the FDA & the Anti-Tobacco Movement, Democracy Institute, April 2009.
- Diet Nation: Exposing the Obesity Crusade, by John Luik, Patrick Basham, and Gio Gori. Social Affairs Unit, December 2006.
- Gambling with Our Future? The Costs and Benefits of Legalized Gambling, by Patrick Basham and Karen White. Christian Institute, 2002, 64pp
- Sensible Solutions to the Urban Drug Problem, edited by Patrick Basham. Vancouver: Fraser Institute, 2001.
- Environmentalism and the Market Economy: A Model for a Green Earth (with Kenneth Basham). (1995).

He contributed to the 2004 book Iraq: Opposing Viewpoints, edited by David Haugen.
