= Samuel Gould =

Samuel Gould may refer to:

- Samuel Wadsworth Gould (1852–1935), American congressman from Maine
- Samuel B. Gould (1910–1997), American educator
- Samuel Julius Gould (1924–2019), English professor
