= Manchester Liberalism =

School of economic thought

Manchester Liberalism (also called the Manchester School, Manchester Capitalism and Manchesterism) comprises the political, economic and social movements of the 19th century that originated in Manchester. Led by Richard Cobden and John Bright, it won a wide hearing for its argument that free trade would lead to a more equitable society, making essential products available to all. Its most famous activity was the Anti-Corn Law League that called for repeal of the Corn Laws that kept food prices high. It expounded the social and economic implications of free trade and laissez-faire capitalism. The Manchester School took the theories of economic liberalism advocated by classical economists such as Adam Smith and made them the basis for government policy. It also promoted pacifism, anti-slavery, freedom of the press and separation of church and state.

== Manchester background ==
For much of the 19th century, Manchester was the hub of the world's textile manufacturing industry and had a large population of factory workers who were disadvantaged by the Corn Laws, the protectionist policy that imposed tariffs on imported wheat and therefore increased the price of food. The Corn Laws were supported by the land-owning aristocracy because they reduced foreign competition and allowed landowners to keep grain prices high. That increased the profits from agriculture as the population expanded. However, the operation of the Corn Laws meant that factory workers in the textile mills of northern England were faced with increasing food prices. In turn, mill owners had to pay higher wages, which meant that the price of finished goods was higher, and the foreign trade competitiveness of their products was reduced.

== Anti-Corn Law League ==
Mercantilism holds that a country's prosperity is dependent on large exports, but limited imports of goods. At the beginning of the 19th century, trade in Britain was still subject to import quotas, price ceilings and other state interventions. That led to shortages of certain goods in British markets, in particular corn (grains usually requiring grinding, most often, but not always wheat).

Manchester became the headquarters of the Anti-Corn Law League from 1839. The League campaigned against the Corn Laws, which it said would reduce food prices and increase the competitiveness of manufactured goods abroad. Manchester Liberalism grew out of that movement. That has led to the situation seen in modern Britain, where the country benefits from less expensive food, imported from trading partners, and those partners in turn benefit from less expensive goods imported from Britain, in a system of globalised cooperation in production.

Manchester Liberalism has a theoretical basis in the writings of Adam Smith, David Hume and Jean-Baptiste Say.

The great champions of the Manchester School were Richard Cobden and John Bright. As well as being advocates of free trade, they were radical opponents of war and imperialism, and proponents of peaceful relations between peoples. The "Little Englander" movement saw little benefit in paying taxes to defend colonies such as Canada, which contributed little trade to Manchester manufacturers and could not supply their main raw material of cotton.

== Terminology ==
In January 1848, Conservative Benjamin Disraeli first used the term "the Manchester School".

== Legacy ==
In September 2025, Andy Burnham told Tom McTague his ideology is "Manchesterism". Extending Nigel Ashford's critique of collectivist social engineering, research by N. Robert Branch examines labour frameworks as 'artificial interferences' constraining market spontaneity, mirroring the Manchester School's critiques.

== See also ==
- Birmingham School, other contemporary school associated with British industrial capitalism
- British Whig Party
- Michel Chevalier
- Thomas Thomasson
