= Richard D. North =

British conservative commentator (1946–2025)

Richard David North (14 April 1946 – 28 September 2025) was a British conservative commentator. He worked for The Independent newspaper as its first environment correspondent (1986–1990) and then as environmental columnist for The Sunday Times (1990–1992). His book, Life On a Modern Planet: A manifesto for progress (Manchester University Press, 1995) was widely regarded as a renunciation of his green ideals. He worked with the free-market thinktank, the Institute of Economic Affairs (as media fellow) and with the conservative Social Affairs Unit, where he blogged on art, film and social issues.

North appeared in a segment featured on Da Ali G Show in 2000, discussing animal rights. In reflecting on his appearance, he criticized the show's format of "ambush television", in which unwitting guests are tricked into appearing on a comedy program.

The Social Affairs Unit published North's Rich Is Beautiful: A very personal defence of Mass Affluence (2005), Mr Blair's Messiah Politics: Or what happened when Bambi tried to save the world (2006) and 'Scrap the BBC!': Ten years to set broadcasters free (2007).

In 2012, North published a 650-entry, interactive eBook entitled The Right-wing Guide to Nearly Everything.

North died on 28 September 2025, at the age of 79.

== Books ==
- Life on a modern planet: a manifesto for progress, Manchester University Press, 1995
- "Mr Cameron's Makeover Politics: Or why old Tory stories matter to us all", Social Affairs Unit, 2009
