= Alma Cook =

American singer-songwriter

- Born: Alma Lynn Cook; Madison, Wisconsin, U.S.
- Genres: Blue-eyed soul; pop; spoken word
- Occupation: Singer-songwriter
- Instruments: Vocals; ukulele; piano
- Years active: 2012–present
- Website: www.hearalma.com

Alma Lynn Cook is an American singer-songwriter and spoken word artist. Her debut album Pass It On was released in 2012, and her single "For a Poet" and full-length project Tactics followed in 2014.

== Early life ==
Cook grew up in Madison, Wisconsin, and attended Columbia College in Chicago. After college, she began playing at various clubs and festivals across the United States, opening for acts including contemporary gospel musician Jonathan McReynolds and Christian rapper George Moss.

== Career ==
Cook released an EP titled Pass It On in September 2012, followed by the single "For a Poet", which charted at No. 2 on Rádio Nova Portugal in December 2014. She later released the full-length album Tactics, produced by bassist Chris Thigpen, whose father Cornell Thigpen (Mary J. Blige, Chaka Khan, Stevie Nicks, and Patti LaBelle) played organ on the song "Hotshot".

As of 2021, Cook was a podcast host and co-director of cultural engagement for Braver Angels, an American nonprofit focused on political depolarization. She was noted by Forbes as a conservative.

In addition to her work as a musician, Cook owns an oil and gas compliance company, Cook Compliance Solutions, based in Williston, North Dakota. The business works with oilfield service providers looking to obtain the right safety certifications, insurance and other measures needed to contract under larger oil companies.

== Discography ==
- Pass It On (2012)
- Us Three: A Live Acoustic Session (2013)
- Tactics (2014)
- For a Poet – Single (2014)
- You & I – Single (2015)
- The Travel Size EP (2016)
- Hearsay – Single (2018)
- Surefire – Single (2018)
- Courtship (2019)
- So Close – Single (2019)
- Bobby - Single (2021)"
- Long Division - Single (2021)
- 5000 Candles - Single (2022)

=== Appears on ===
- "Fast Car" (Daytrotter, 2013) – Kwesi K
- "What the DJ Spins" (Empire, 2014) – Terrence Howard
- "Get Your Life" (2015) – Caught A Ghost
- "Providence" (2016), "Painkillers" (2016) – OBY
- "White Lie" (2016), "Fountain" (2018), "Heavyweight" (2018) – Hamster
- "Gone" (2017) – Da$Htone
- "Someday" (2020) – Da$Htone

== Recognition ==
- 2014: Media Communication Association-International (MCA-I) WAVE Award and Judge's Choice Award for "Chicago (Beacons)" lyric video
- 2015: MCA-I WAVE Award for "Hypocrite" lyric video
