= Regulatory Toxicology and Pharmacology =

- Discipline: Toxicology and pharmacology
- Language: English
- Edited by: Lesa L. Aylward; Martin van den Berg

Publication details
- History: 1981–present
- Publisher: Elsevier on behalf of the International Society of Toxicology & Pharmacology
- Frequency: Monthly
- Impact factor: 3.271 (2021)

Standard abbreviations
- ISO 4: Regul. Toxicol. Pharmacol.

Indexing
- CODEN: RTOPDW
- ISSN: 0273-2300
- LCCN: 81646304
- OCLC no.: 485750423

Links
- Journal homepage; Online access

Regulatory Toxicology and Pharmacology is a monthly peer-reviewed scientific journal which covers legal aspects of toxicological and pharmacological regulations. It is published by Elsevier on behalf of the International Society of Regulatory Toxicology & Pharmacology. The current co-editors-in-chief are Lesa L. Aylward and Martin van den Berg.

== Conflicts of interest ==
In 2002, a group of 45 academics wrote a letter accusing the journal of a concealed pro-industry bias, a possible lack of full and independent peer review, and a failure to disclose conflicts of interest, citing a case in which Gio Batta Gori, then-current editor-in-chief, was paid $30,000 by the Tobacco Institute to write an article later published in the journal dismissing the health risks of secondhand smoke. The letter's coordinator later commented that the journal "reads like an industry trade publication, but it's masked as a peer-reviewed journal" and that it lacked any "credible peer-review process." In response, the journal's publisher implemented a conflict of interest disclosure policy at the journal in January 2003, shortly before the correspondence was published.

An analysis of 52 articles published in the journal about tobacco or nicotine between January 2013 and June 2015 identified that among 50 of them at least one of the authors had ties with tobacco industry. In 38 of those 50 papers, the conclusions were positive for the industry while none was negative. The two papers without any ties to the industry had conclusions negative towards the industry. The authors of the article question the confidence the scientific community can have in the journal.

In December 2025, the journal retracted an influential article published in 2000 that argued that Glyphosate was not a carcinogen. The journal's co-editor, Martin van den Berg said the retraction "was necessary to maintain the scientific integrity of the journal". The article's conclusion were based in part on internal unpublished studies by American agricultural company Monsanto, the makers of Roundup, a glyphosate-based herbicide, while already published studies were not taken into account. The authors may have been paid by Monsanto, and Monsanto employers may have written part of the study, a Monsanto practice exposed in 2024.

== Abstracting and indexing ==
The journal is abstracted and indexed in EMBASE, EMBiology, and Scopus.

According to the Journal Citation Reports, the journal has a 2014 impact factor of 2.031, ranking it 56th out of 87 journals in the category "Toxicology" and 146th out of 254 journals in the category "Pharmacology & pharmacy".
