= Andrew Masanto =

Indonesian lawyer and technologist (born 1982)

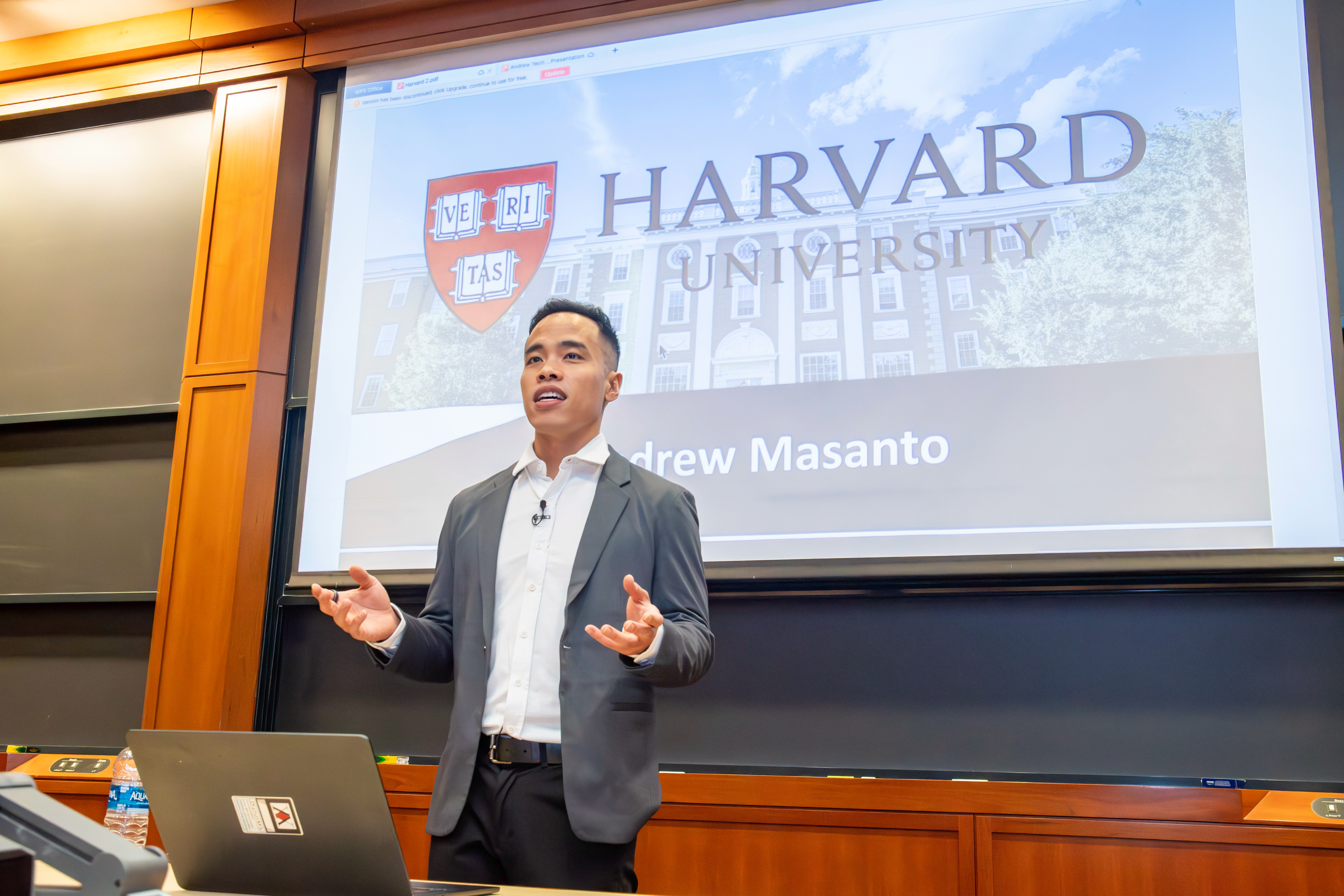
- Born: May 17, 1982; Jakarta, Indonesia
- Education: University of Sydney
- Occupations: Lawyer and technologist

Andrew Jonathan Masanto (born May 17, 1982) is an Indonesian entrepreneur. He co-founded two of the top 100 cryptocurrencies, Hedera Hashgraph in 2017 and Reserve in 2019. He and his brother Christopher Masanto also co-founded Pet Lab Co, a pet company in the United States in 2021.

== Early life and education ==
Masanto was born in Jakarta, Indonesia. He and his family moved to Australia when he was two. After high school, he enrolled at the University of Sydney, undertaking a dual degree in Commerce and Law, and graduated with First Class Honors and Dean’s List in both degrees in 2005.

== Career ==
Andrew Masanto started his professional career in 2006 as a lawyer at Linklaters, a Magic Circle law firm based in London.

In 2017, Masanto partnered with Mance Harmon and Leemon Baird from Swirlds to work on Hedera Hashgraph, a public distributed ledger based on the Hashgraph algorithm. Hedera (HBAR) is the native cryptocurrency of the Hedera Hashgraph system – a uniquely structured technology that is claimed to be faster, more efficient, and secure than blockchain technology. Hedera uses its own ‘Gossip’ protocol, where each node on the network communicates with every other node on the network to record and authenticate transactions. The network of individual transaction data, each connected to all other data, creates a Directed Acyclic Graph (DAG), which is the backbone of the Hashgraph Consensus Mechanism. The Hedera Hashgraph has a governance system comprising 39 industry leaders spread across geographies and 11 different sectors, including Google, Boeing, IBM, Deutsche Telekom, LG, Tata Communications, Dell, DBS Bank, etc.

Following this, in 2018, he joined the Reserve project as the Founding Chief Marketing Officer, aiming to create a stable digital currency.

Also in 2018, he launched a pet company - PetLab Co with his brother Chris Masanto and Damian Grabarczyk, a webshop that sells a wide range of vitamin supplements, treats, chews, grooming products, and accessories for pets.

In 2021, he co-founded Nillion with Dr. Miguel de Vega, with the ambition of advancing decentralised infrastructure through an innovation in Multi Party Computation (MPC) technology.

Alongside his tech ventures, Masanto enrolled at ICON Collective music school and initiated the ANONA movement. This movement, fostering online collaboration between artists and non-artists, gained popularity during the Coronavirus Pandemic.

Masanto is also actively involved in the biohacking and longevity community, running a group called biohackinggroup.com, and sharing insights on health and longevity.

He is also a board member of Cornerstone Capital Inc, a New York based investment firm, which offers investment banking, strategic consulting and wealth management services.
