= John Luik =

American scholar

John C. Luik was a senior fellow of the Democracy Institute. A Rhodes Scholar attached to Hertford College at the University of Oxford, he was a Senior Associate of the Niagara Institute (an affiliate of the Conference Board of Canada) with responsibility for its work in public policy and its Values and Organizational Development programmes." From 1977 to 1990 he taught philosophy and ethics at two Canadian universities, but was dismissed from each (in 1985 and 1990) for misrepresenting his academic credentials. He acted on behalf of the tobacco industry amongst others and was prominent in criticising the evidence related to the claimed links between passive smoking and cancer.

== Career ==
=== 1977–1990 ===
Luik taught philosophy at Canadian Nazarene College in Winnipeg, Manitoba, Canada from 1977 to 1985. He was dismissed in 1985 because, at the time of his appointment, he had not been awarded the University of Sydney Ph.D. that he had claimed. A former Rhodes Scholar (1971), he returned to Oxford and was awarded his PhD in 1986. He was subsequently hired by Brock University in St. Catharine's, Ontario where he taught applied and professional ethics. Brock University was fully aware of Luik's earlier misrepresentation.

Brock dismissed Luik in 1990 when it transpired that he had gained his position "on the basis of a further padded CV claiming teaching experience and publications that he did not have. What caused concern and led to Luik's dismissal from Brock was 'not any single misrepresentation ... so much as the apparently uniform pattern of representations engaged in since 1977' (Marsden 2001: A12)." The then Dean of Humanities at Brock, Cecil Abrahams, later told CBC Television "I certainly would not trust anything John Luik says because he must be the worst case of fraud that I have come across and I've been an administrator at universities for a long period of time, both in North America and in Africa, and I think he's by far the worst case of fraudulent behaviour".

=== 1990 onwards ===
In 1993 Luik wrote Pandora's box: the dangers of politically corrupted science for democratic public policy, in response to the United States Environmental Protection Agency report which classified environmental tobacco smoke as a human carcinogen. Documents later made public as a result of the Tobacco Master Settlement Agreement showed that "Luik had corresponded regularly with John Lepere, chairman of the Confederation of European Community Cigarette Manufacturers (CECCM) on the content of the paper and where it should be published."

In January 1994 Luik published "Do Tobacco Advertising Bans Really Work? A Review of the Evidence. He is credited as a scholar with the Niagara Institute, with assistance from the International Advertising Association.

In mid 1996 Luik was hired by the Australian tobacco industry to 'criss-cross the country' promoting his book Smokescreen: Passive Smoking and Public Policy which attacked the US Environmental Protection Agency's risk assessment which had determined that second-hand tobacco smoke (Environmental Tobacco Smoke, or ETS) as a "Known carcinogen". His book was published and promoted by the Institute of Public Affairs (IPA) which was funded by the Australian cigarette companies. This was set up to counter a public tour of Australia by the anti-smoking activist Stanton Glantz of the University of California, San Francisco.

Luik became a Senior Fellow at the Democracy Institute, where amongst other subjects he continued to work on tobacco. A 2006 paper titled "Why Graphic Warnings Don't Work" was acknowledged as being "made possible by funding provided by Imperial Tobacco Group PLC".

== Books ==
- Unintended Consequences of Health Fascism, Institute of Economic Affairs, 2011
- Diet Nation: Exposing the Obesity Crusade, by John Luik, Patrick Basham, and Gio Gori. Social Affairs Unit, December 2006.
- Passive Smoke: The EPA's Betrayal of Science and Policy, by John Luik and Gio Gori. Fraser Institute, January 1999.
- Advertising and Markets: A Collection of Seminal Papers, by M.J. Waterson and John C. Luik (eds), NTC Publications, 1996
- Smokescreen: 'passive smoking' and public policy, Institute of Public Affairs, 1996
- The Question of Humanism: Challenges and Possibilities by David Goicoechea, John Luik, and Tim Madigan (eds). Prometheus Books, 1991

== Selected papers ==
- Luik, J.C. and Basham, P., (2008), "Is the obesity epidemic exaggerated? Yes", British Medical Journal
- Luik, J.C. (1996), "I can't help myself: Addiction as Ideology", Human Psychopharmacology
- Luik, J.C. (1993), "Tobacco advertising bans and the dark face of government paternalism", International journal of advertising, 12, pp303 – 324.
- Luik, J.C. (1991), "Government Paternalism and Citizen Rationality. The Justifiability of Banning Tobacco Advertising"
