= Richie Edwards (basketball) =

American-New Zealand basketball player

Personal information
- Born: June 30, 1990 (age 36) Albany, New York, U.S.
- Listed height: 6 ft 7 in (2.01 m)
- Listed weight: 210 lb (95 kg)

Career information
- High school: Middleton Grange School (Christchurch, New Zealand); Lakeland Senior (Lakeland, Florida)
- College: Hillsborough CC (2009–2011); Valparaiso (2011–2012); Arizona State (2013–2014)
- NBA draft: 2014: undrafted
- Playing career: 2014–2015
- Position: Small forward / power forward

Career history
- 2014: Canterbury Rams
- 2014: Adelaide 36ers
- 2015: Canterbury Rams
- 2015: Plymouth Raiders

Career highlights
- NZNBL Rookie of the Year (2014)

Justin Richard "Richie" Edwards (born June 30, 1990) is an American-New Zealand former professional basketball player. After four seasons of college in the United States, Edwards returned to his adoptive home in New Zealand to play for the Canterbury Rams. He won the NZNBL Rookie of the Year in 2014 and later had stints in Australia and England.

== Early life ==
Edwards was born in Albany, New York to parents Johnathan and Debbie Edwards. At a young age, he moved with his missionary parents to Christchurch, New Zealand. There he attended the basketball-focused Middleton Grange School, where he graduated from in 2007. In 2008–09, Edwards attended Lakeland Senior High School in Lakeland, Florida for a prep season. He went on to earn first-team All-State honors with the Dreadnaughts. He was also honored as the county Player of the Year and the Lakeland Ledger Player of the Year after averaging 17.7 points and 9.5 rebounds per game.

== College career ==
From 2009 to 2011, Edwards attended Hillsborough Community College. In his two seasons for the Hawks, he was a two-time All-Conference selection. As a freshman, he averaged 16 points and seven rebounds per game, and as a sophomore, he averaged 18.6 points and 6.8 rebounds per game.

In 2011, Edwards transferred to Valparaiso University. As a junior in 2011–12, he was a role player for the Crusaders, coming off the bench to record 12 double-figure scoring games. In 30 games, he averaged 9.4 points and 3.1 rebounds in 17.8 minutes per game.

In 2012, Edwards transferred to Arizona State University and subsequently sat out the 2012–13 season due to NCAA transfer rules. As a senior in 2013–14, he played just 15 games for the Sun Devils, averaging 2.5 points in 6.7 minutes per game.

== Professional career ==
On March 24, 2014, Edwards signed with the Canterbury Rams for the 2014 New Zealand NBL season. In 17 games, he averaged 17.8 points, 5.5 rebounds and 1.3 assists per game. He was subsequently named Rookie of the Year.

On October 29, 2014, Edwards signed with the Adelaide 36ers of the Australian NBL as an injury-replacement for Mitch Creek. On November 21, 2014, he was released by the 36ers following Creek's return. In three games, he averaged 1.7 points per game.

On February 8, 2015, Edwards re-signed with the Rams for the 2015 season. In 18 games, he averaged 17.7 points, 4.1 rebounds, 1.2 assists and 1.0 steals per game.

In August 2015, Edwards joined the Wellington Saints for their Asian tour, playing in Taiwan at the William Jones Cup and in the Philippines at the MVP Cup.

On October 10, 2015, Edwards signed with the Plymouth Raiders of the British Basketball League. However, he was released on November 7 after just two games, with the club citing "flagrant disregard for club rules, and for serious off court issues".

== National team career ==
Edwards became one of the youngest Junior Tall Blacks when he debuted at just 14 years old in 2005. At the 2009 FIBA Under-19 World Championship, he averaged 14.9 points and 7.0 rebounds per game. At the 2011 World University Games, he led New Zealand in scoring and finished third among all tournament players, averaging 20.1 points per game.
