= Hawk Newsome =

American political activist

Walter "Hawk" Newsome is an American law school graduate.

== Biography ==
Newsome worked as a paralegal for the Bronx District Attorney's Office and also worked as a project manager at the law firm Wilson Elser Moskowitz Edelman & Dicker. He unsuccessfully ran for a seat on the New York City Council from The Bronx, garnering around 3% of the vote on a platform Newsome said was "too radical". He subsequently co-founded Black Lives Matter of Greater New York with Chivona Newsome. Chivona later stepped down from the group to run for a U.S. House seat in The Bronx.

In 2017 Newsome attended the Mother of All Rallies in Washington, DC. He was invited onstage by Tommy Hodges, the rally organizer, to speak for two minutes; Hodges told Newsome "Whether they disagree or agree with your message is irrelevant. It's the fact that you have the right to have the message". Newsome tried to connect with the crowd, saying "I am the president of Black Lives Matter New York. I am an American. And the beauty of America is that when you see something broken in your country, you can mobilize to fix it". The crowd applauded, and afterward Newsome decided he was "not out to argue, to fight. I'm there to make people understand, to make people come together. I'm here for progress".

In September 2021, Newsome called COVID-19 vaccine mandates "racist" and "discrimination."

In November 2021, Newsome threatened "riots", "fire", and "bloodshed" in the streets if New York City mayor-elect Eric Adams reinstated the New York City Police Department's (NYPD) controversial anti-crime units. Later, when asked whether he condemned riots and burning down buildings after a police use-of-force incident he did not approve of he said, "I’m not going to condemn, nor am I going to condone it."

Newsome has filed two ongoing civil lawsuits against the NYPD, alleging that he was assaulted by police officers and falsely arrested during two separate protests in 2017 and 2018. A video posted by the New York Daily News shows a police officer punching Newsome before several police officers tackled him to the ground. Newsome was holding a sign that read: "Blue Klux Klan".

The New York Times stated that as people were leaving the courtroom after the acquittal of Daniel Penny for the death of Jordan Neely, Newsome, who was present in the courtroom and "...who has led daily protests during the trial — said toward Mr. Penny: 'It’s a small world, buddy.' Several people gasped and court officers urged the group to keep moving. Mr. Penny and his team were quickly ushered out."

Later, addressing a crowd, Newsome made a similar threat, calling for "black vigilantism".

Newsome was interviewed and featured in the award-winning documentary feature film Reimagining Safety (2023) by director Matthew Solomon. The film covers defunding the police and the George Floyd protests.

== Relationship with BLM ==
In June 2020, then-U.S. President Donald Trump described Newsome in a tweet as a "Black Lives Matter leader." This description of Newsome prompted a response from managing director of the Black Lives Matter Global Network Foundation Kailee Scales, who stated that Newsome "has no relation to the Black Lives Matter Global Network," "is not the 'president' of BLM or any of its chapters," and that his group "is not a chapter of BLM and has not entered into any agreement with BLM agreeing to adhere to BLM's core principles," adding, "the only official chapter of BLM in New York is Black Lives Matter NYC."

== Personal life ==
Newsome lives in The Bronx in New York City. He regularly attends Baptist service and smokes cigars. Newsome often wears a bulletproof vest and drives a rotation of rented vehicles for security and safety purposes.

Hawk Newsome was arrested at Bronx Criminal Court May 14th, 2024. Video clips show Hawk in verbal altercations with the court officers. According to the NY Post, "At one point, Newsome was filmed grabbing a female cop’s hand and batting it away after the officer apparently tried to move on a woman who was with Newsome." According to CBS, "Newsome was slapped with three summonses for disorderly conduct in the wake of the caught-on-camera saga."
