= Democracy Institute =

American think tank

- Abbreviation: DI
- Formation: 2006
- Type: Think tank
- Headquarters: Washington, DC, United States and London, UK
- Director: Patrick Basham
- Website: democracyinstitute.org

The Democracy Institute is a think tank based in Washington, DC, and London. It was founded in 2006. According to the University of Bath's Tobacco Tactics project the institute has taken part in pro-tobacco activities and has previously received funding from the tobacco industry.

On its website the Institute says that "We commonly address public policy in comparative terms. Many of our research projects, therefore, have a transatlantic or international flavor. We are currently conducting and commissioning work in the following areas: democratization; education policy; electoral studies; the European Union; fiscal studies; health care; international relations; obesity; and the regulation of risk."

The institute's founding Director, Patrick Basham, is a former adjunct scholar with the Cato Institute, and was previously the founding director of the Social Affairs Center at the Canadian Fraser Institute.

The institute's Advisory Council includes Chris Edwards, Christopher Preble and Marian Tupy of the Cato Institute, Martin Zelder of Duke University and Ivan Eland of the Independent Institute. Nigel Ashford of the Institute for Humane Studies is also a member of the council as is Jeannie Cameron, who was formerly employed by British American Tobacco. Jeremy Lott, formerly of the Competitive Enterprise Institute, is a Senior Fellow.

A 2006 Democracy Institute book by then Senior Fellow John Luik on Why Graphic Warnings Don't Work was acknowledged as being "made possible by funding provided by Imperial Tobacco Group PLC".
