= Tim Wilson (broadcaster) =

New Zealand journalist, producer and author

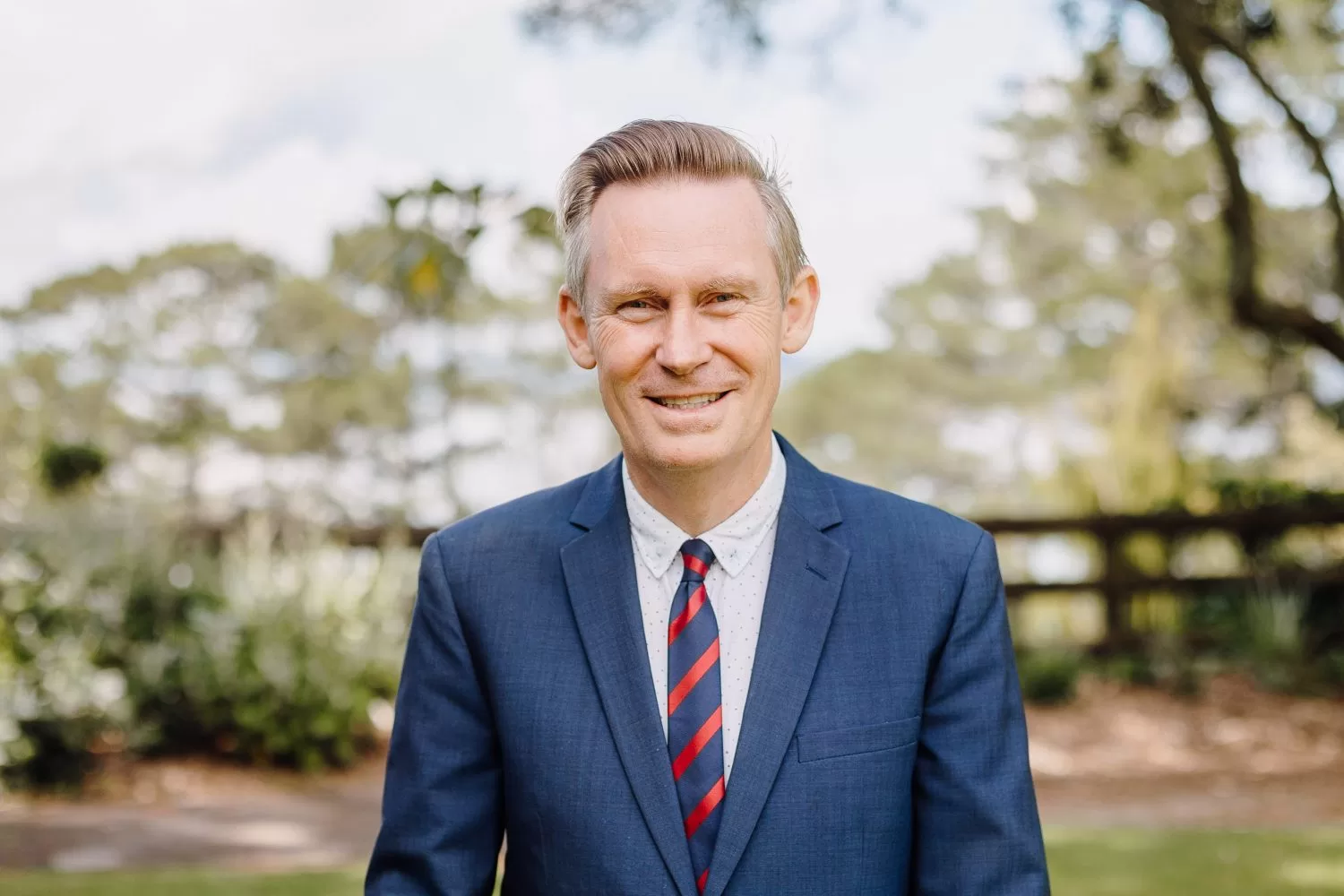
Tim Wilson

Tim Wilson is a former New Zealand journalist and broadcaster, who is currently the executive director of the Maxim Institute.

== Early life and family ==
Wilson was born in Dunedin and adopted by a Presbyterian minister who relocated the family to Pōkeno and then to New Plymouth and finally Whanganui when Wilson was a teenager. Wilson studied at the University of Auckland.

While working in New York, Wilson converted to Catholicism. He met his future wife, Rachel, a former primary school teacher, in a Catholic church in Auckland; the couple have four children.

== Career ==
=== Journalism ===
Wilson was formerly a staff writer at Metro magazine before moving to New York City to work as a freelance journalist in September 2001. After making occasional contributions to TVNZ's news bulletins, he was hired as One News' first full-time US correspondent in 2004; his first assignment was the inauguration of George W Bush. He held this position until 2012, when he returned to New Zealand. He has since worked across TVNZ's Breakfast and Seven Sharp programmes as a producer and reporter, and hosting radio programmes on Newstalk ZB.

Wilson left TVNZ in October 2020.

=== Literary career ===
Tim Wilson has published five books. His first, Good as Goldie (Hatchette; 2002), tells the story of New Zealand art forger Karl Sim. Wilson's four works of fiction are published by Victoria University Press. His first novel Their Faces Were Shining was published in 2010. A collection of short fiction, The Desolation Angel, was published in 2011. News Pigs was published in 2014 with the sequel The Straight Banana published in 2016.

=== Public policy ===
Wilson is currently executive director of the Maxim Institute, an independent public policy think tank.

== See also ==
- List of New Zealand television personalities
