= David Blankenhorn =

American political activist (born 1955)

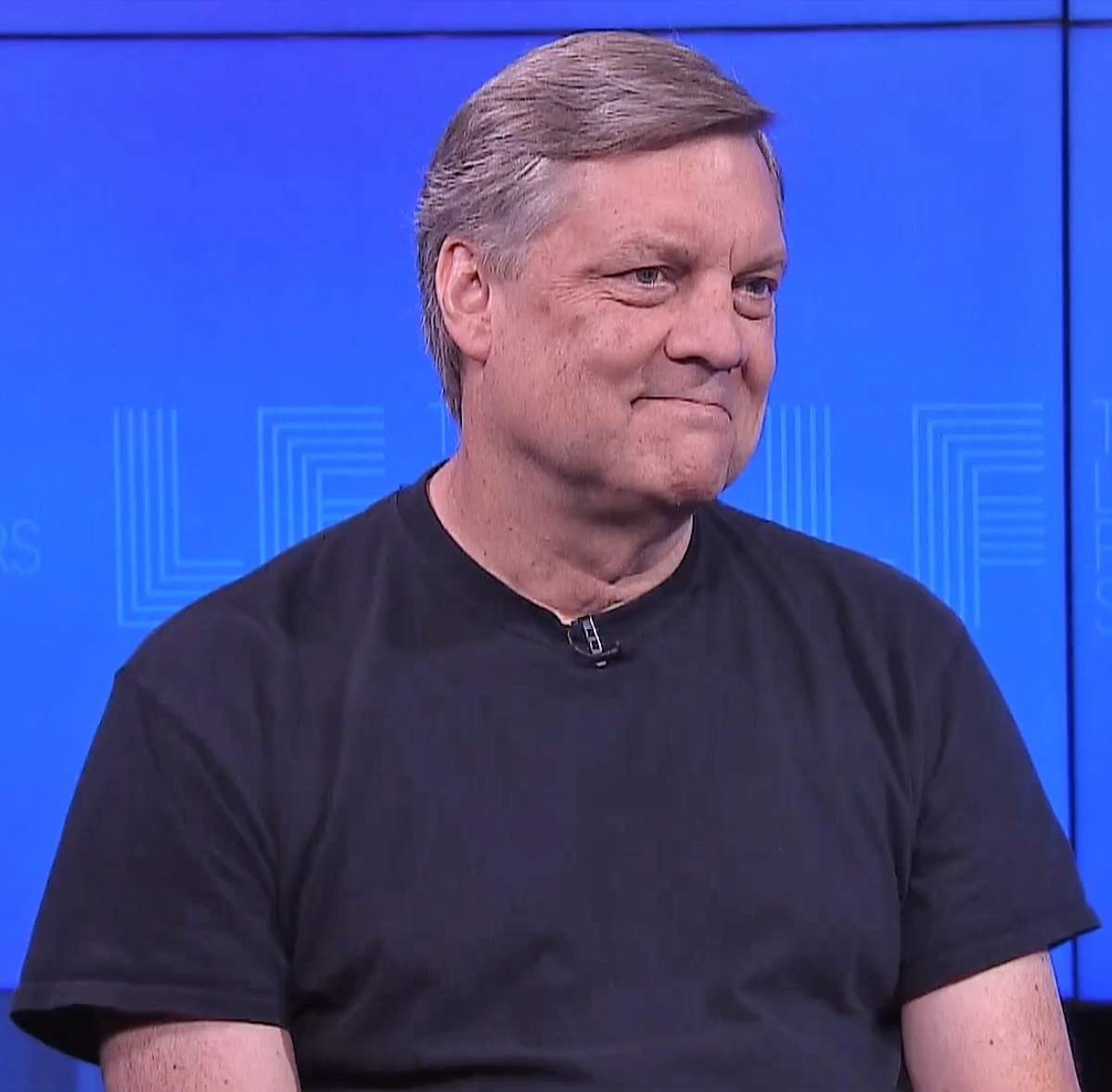
Blankenhorn on The Laura Flanders Show in 2019

David Blankenhorn (born 1955) is an American civic activist and writer whose work has focused on family life topics such as fatherhood and marriage as well as civil society and political polarization. He founded and was president of the Institute for American Values, and co-founded Braver Angels. He wrote such books as Fatherless America and The Future of Marriage. Once a prominent opponent of same-sex marriage in the United States, his position changed and he voiced an acceptance same-sex marriage in June 2012.

== Biography ==
Born in Jackson, Mississippi, Blankenhorn received a bachelor's degree in Social Studies, magna cum laude, from Harvard University in 1977; he was also awarded a master's degree, with distinction, in Comparative Social History from University of Warwick in Coventry. Blankenhorn served as a VISTA volunteer and was involved in community organizing. Blankenhorn founded the Institute for American Values, a nonpartisan think tank whose stated mission is to "study and strengthen key American values", in 1987.

In 1992, President George H. W. Bush appointed Blankenhorn to serve on the National Commission on America's Urban Families. Blankenhorn helped to found the National Fatherhood Initiative, a nonpartisan organization focused on responsible fatherhood, in 1994. As of 2007, Blankenhorn has written "scores of op-ed pieces and essays, co-edited eight books and written two." As of 2007–2008, Blankenhorn identifies as a liberal Democrat. Blankenhorn and his wife Raina are the parents of three children, and they reside in New York City.

=== Braver Angels ===
Braver Angels (originally Better Angels) is an initiative working to depolarize U.S. politics. Founded shortly after the 2016 United States presidential election, the organization runs workshops, debates, and other events where "red" (conservative) and "blue" (liberal) participants come to better understand each other's positions and discover their shared values. The name was inspired by Abraham Lincoln's plea for national unity at the close of his first inaugural address. The name was changed to Braver Angels in 2020 pursuant to a trademark infringement suit.

=== Perry v. Schwarzenegger testimony ===
Blankenhorn was presented to the court as an expert witness in Perry v. Schwarzenegger by the proponents of California Proposition 8 (2008), a constitutional amendment restricting marriage to the union of opposite-sex couples. On cross-examination by David Boies, Blankenhorn stated that marriage's "rule of two people" is not violated by polygamy because even "in instances of a man engaging in polygamous marriage, each marriage is separate. He — one man — marries one woman." During questioning, Blankenhorn stated, "I believe that adopting same-sex marriage would be likely to improve the well-being of gay and lesbian households and their children." He also identified 22 other benefits of adopting same-sex marriage, published on page 203 of his book The Future of Marriage, stating only 5 with which he disagreed. Some of the benefits with which he agreed included that it would increase the proportion of gays and lesbians in stable, committed relationships; lead to higher living standards for same-sex couples; lead to fewer children growing up in state institutions and more growing up in loving adoptive and foster families; decrease the amount of anti-gay prejudice and hate crimes; and decrease the number of those warily viewed as "other" in society, further reaching the American ideal. In the decision filed on August 4, 2010, Judge Vaughn Walker noted that Blankenhorn lacked scholarly credentials and his testimony was speculative and did not carry credibility.

=== Changing position on same-sex marriage ===
In June 2012, Blankenhorn announced in a New York Times opinion column that his stance on same-sex marriage had changed. He observed that the opposition voiced in his book and in his trial testimony was founded in a belief that "children have the right, insofar as society makes it possible, to know and to be cared for by the two parents who brought them into this world", a right that he argued is guaranteed by the 1990 United Nations Convention on the Rights of the Child. While that belief had not changed (being central to his view that "gay marriage has become a significant contributor to marriage’s continuing deinstitutionalization"), it was now trumped by other more holistic factors. He cited "the equal dignity of homosexual love", "comity", and "respect for an emerging consensus" as positive reasons for his now supporting same-sex marriage. Noting that the fight against same-sex marriage had not advanced the cause of marriage more generally, he expressed a hope that gay and straight couples alike could join together in efforts to strengthen marriage.

== Cultural depictions ==
Blankenhorn appears as a character in 8, Dustin Lance Black's play about the trial surrounding Proposition 8, in which the character recites portions of the Perry v. Schwarzenegger testimony. The part has been performed by Rob Reiner and John C. Reilly. Reiner played Blankenhorn again in When We Rise.
