= Wilson Elser Moskowitz Edelman & Dicker =

Law firm

Wilson Elser
- Headquarters: New York City
- No. of offices: 44
- No. of attorneys: 1,421 (2026)
- Major practice areas: General practice
- Key people: Daniel J. McMahon, Chairman
- Date founded: 1978; 48 years ago
- Company type: Limited liability partnership
- Website: www.wilsonelser.com

Wilson Elser Moskowitz Edelman & Dicker, (known as Wilson Elser), is a law firm with over 1,400 attorneys across 44 offices, including 43 in the United States and one in London. The firm's practice originated in insurance defense litigation and has since expanded into a broader range of legal services.

== History ==
Attorney Sol Kroll helped found the predecessor firm to what is known today as Wilson Elser, alongside Max Edelman, and is credited with pioneering the concept of the multi-state law firm. The firm came to be known as Kroll, Edelman, Elser, & Wilson by the 1970s. Kroll left the firm in 1979 to found the now-defunct Kroll & Tract.

Wilson Elser was established in 1978 by attorneys Thomas Wilson Sr., John Elser, Harold Moskowitz, Max Edelman, and Herbert Dicker. While the firm's heritage is in the area of insurance defense, it has increasingly expanded into the corporate and transactional realms and now represents clients in a wide range of legal services.

== Recognition ==
As of 2026, Wilson Elser had 1,421 U.S. attorneys, including 371 partners, according to the Law360 400 ranking of the largest U.S. law firms. With gross revenue of $452.2 million in 2023, the firm placed 103rd on The American Lawyer's 2024 Am Law 200 ranking, and 144th on the 2023 Global 200 survey of the world's highest-grossing law firms.

Wilson Elser ranked 8th out of 68 large firms (with at least 601 attorneys) in Law360's 2025 Women in Law Report, which assessed the representation of women at all levels of U.S. law firms using 2024 data.

Wilson Elser has received Mansfield Certified Plus recognition for 2023–2024 from Diversity Lab, a year-long certification process assessing law firms' consideration of diverse talent for leadership roles.

== Controversies ==
The law firm came under public criticism in a 2024 case of an American Airlines employee secretly videotaping a 9-year-old girl, among 3 other minors, with an iPhone taped to a bathroom seat. As a part of the defense for American Airline, the firm argued that the minors were at fault because they should have been aware they were being videotaped. Following public backlash, American Airlines removed Wilson Elser from the case within days and retained a different firm to represent it; a Texas state judge approved the firm's withdrawal in June 2024.

== See also ==
- Cellino & Barnes
