= Nigel Ashford =

Politician from the United Kingdom

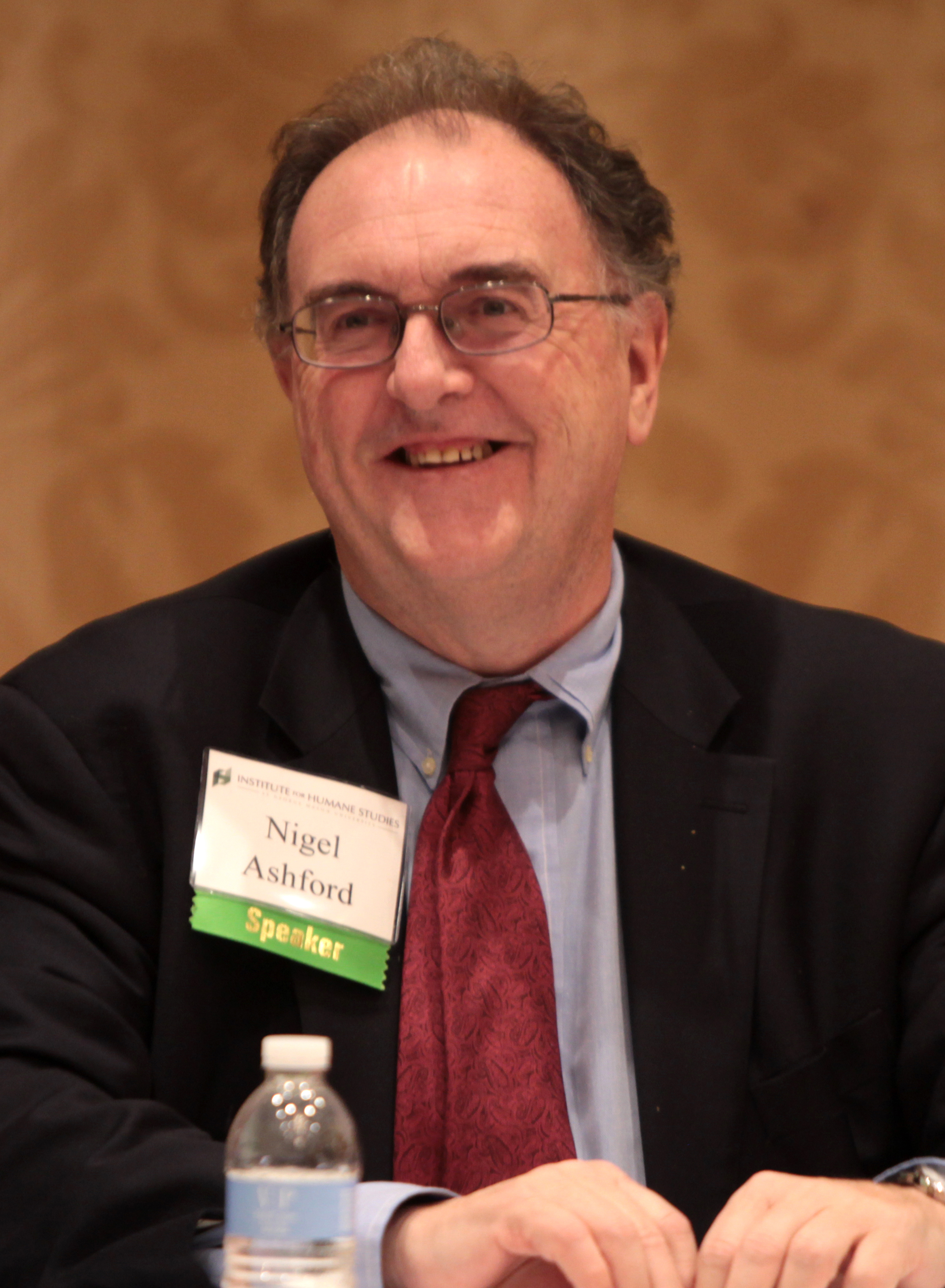
Ashford in 2015.

Nigel Ashford (born 1952) is a British-born, U.S.-based academic and author, primarily in the field of politics. He serves as the Senior Programs Officer at the Institute for Humane Studies.

== Career ==
Ashford was a professor of politics at Staffordshire University, where he was also a Jean Monnet Scholar. He served as the director the Principles of a Free Society Project at the Jarl Hjalmarson Foundation in Sweden. He was a recipient of the International Anthony Fisher Trust Prize.

Ashford serves as the senior programs officer at the Institute for Humane Studies. He also served on the advisory council of the Democracy Institute.

== Bibliography ==
- US Politics Today (1999)
- Public Policy and the Impact of the New Right (1994)
- A Dictionary of Conservative and Libertarian Thought (1991)
