= Julius Gould =

British sociologist (1924–2019)

Samuel Julius Gould (13 October 1924 – 4 December 2019) was Emeritus Professor of Sociology at the University of Nottingham.

After studying at Balliol College, Oxford, where he gained an MA in PPE, he worked at Bletchley Park as a codebreaker.

== Other positions ==
- 1981-2007 Chairman of trustees, Social Affairs Unit
- 1993-4 Council of the United Synagogue

== Publications ==
- Dictionary of the Social Sciences (joint editor)
- Jewish Life in Modern Britain (joint editor)
- The Attack on Higher Education
- Jewish Commitment: A study in London

== Sources ==
- Jewish Year Book, 2005, p. 249
