= Gio Batta Gori =

American epidemiologist

Gio Batta Gori is an American epidemiologist and fellow with the Health Policy Center in Bethesda, Maryland which he established in 1997 and where he specializes in risk assessment and scientific research. He was deputy director of the United States' National Cancer Institute's Division of Cancer Cause and Prevention, where he directed the Smoking and Health Program and the Diet and Cancer Program.

He organized and directed the Franklin Institute Policy Analysis Center, funded by Brown & Williamson. He is the editor-in-chief of the journal Regulatory Toxicology and Pharmacology.

He has consulted for the tobacco industry, challenging specific scientific claims concerning the risks associated with tobacco use. He is also known for advocating the regulation and taxation of cigarettes and other tobacco products based on their specific delivery of carcinogens and other hazardous substances, so as to promote risk reduction.

== National Cancer Institute ==
Gio Batta Gori has a doctorate in biological sciences and a master's degree in public health. Between 1968 and 1980, he was a scientist and senior official at the United States' National Cancer Institute (NCI), where he specialized in toxicology, epidemiology and nutrition. He held several positions, including Deputy Director of the Division of Cancer Causes and Prevention; Acting Associate Director, Carcinogenesis Program; Director of the Diet, Nutrition and Cancer Program and Director of the Smoking and Health Program.

== Links with the tobacco industry ==
In 1980 Gori became Vice President of the Franklin Institute Policy Analysis Center (FIPAC), a consulting firm funded initially by a $400,000 grant from the Brown & Williamson Tobacco Corporation (B&W). Following its initial formation, FIPAC continued to receive hundreds of thousands of dollars in funding annually from B&W. Gori worked on Research & Development projects for B&W Tobacco, such as analysis of the sensory perception of smoke and how to reduce the amount of tobacco in cigarettes. By 1989, Gori was a full-time consultant on environmental tobacco smoke issues for the Tobacco Institute in the Institute's ETS/IAQ (Indoor Air Quality) Consultants Project. In May 1993, Gori entered an exclusive consulting arrangement with B&W Tobacco, receiving $200/hour a day to $1,000/day for attending conferences. In the 118-page book Passive Smoke: The EPA's Betrayal of Science and Policy, Gio Gori and his co-author and fellow industry consultant, John Luik, falsely claimed the U.S. Environmental Protection Agency (EPA) used "junk science" to distort the health effects of secondhand smoke. The book was funded by B&W, which funneled the money through a third party, the Fraser Institute.

== Criticism ==
David Cantor writes that Gori has been criticised for his career as a consultant for the tobacco industry and that critics of Gori have questioned his scientific and management credentials. Other academics who have criticised Gori include Richard Kluger and Devra Davis.

== Works ==
- Gio Batta Gori, Virtually Safe Cigarettes: Reviving an Opportunity Once Tragically Rejected, IOS Press Inc, January 2000. ISBN 1-58603-057-4 ISBN 978-1586030575
- Gio B. Gori, John Luik, Passive Smoke: The EPA's Betrayal of Science and Policy, The Fraser Institute, 1999. ISBN 0-88975-196-X

== Sources ==
- Text adapted from Gio Batta Gori - SourceWatch under the GFDL
