= Social Affairs Unit =

Right-leaning think tank in the United Kingdom

- Abbreviation: SAU
- Formation: 1980; 46 years ago
- Type: Social policy think tank
- Headquarters: London, United Kingdom
- Director: Michael Mosbacher (2004 - 2019)
- Website: www.socialaffairsunit.org.uk

The Social Affairs Unit was a right-leaning think tank in the United Kingdom. Founded in 1980 as an offshoot of the Institute of Economic Affairs, it published books on a variety of social issues. Its website notes that "many SAU supporters are inclined to believe that the generation which fought the Second World War were rather too keen on social engineering over the goals of personal responsibility".

The Unit published Standpoint (2008 - 2021), a monthly cultural and political newsstand magazine edited by Daniel Johnson (2008 - 2018), Michael Mosbacher (2018 - 2019), Edward Lucas (2019 - 2020) and Andreas Campomar (2020 - 2021).

== History ==
The Social Affairs Unit was established in December 1980 as an offshoot of the Institute of Economic Affairs, in order to carry the IEA's economic ideas into the field of sociology. "Within a few years the Social Affairs Unit became independent from the IEA, acquiring its own premises." Founded in 1980 as a registered charity, its founder chairman was Professor Julius Gould, and its founder Director, Dr. Digby Anderson. Anderson often contributed leading articles to UK national newspapers, was Director from 1980 to 2004, when he retired and was succeeded by Michael Mosbacher.

== Funding ==
Documents released as part of the Tobacco Master Settlement Agreement showed that the Unit accepted funding from British American Tobacco in the 1980s.

== People ==
=== Trustees ===
- Prof. David Womersley
- Prof. Simon Green
- Mark Fisher CBE FRSA

=== Other ===
- Director: Michael Mosbacher (2004 - 2019)
- Media Fellow: Richard D. North (2004 - 2012) (died 2025)

=== Advisory Council ===
- Dr. Digby Anderson
- Dr. Alejandro Chafuen
- Professor Christie Davies (died 2017)
- Professor Adrian Furnham
- Professor Jacques Garello (died 2025)
- Professor Nathan Glazer (died 2019)
- Dr. Simon Green
- Professor Leonard Liggio (died 2014)
- Professor David Martin (died 2019)
- Professor Antonio Martino (died 2022)
- Professor Michael Novak (died 2017)
- John O'Sullivan

== See also ==
- List of UK think tanks

== Books ==
- Oliver Kamm (2005). Anti-totalitarianism: The Left-wing Case for a Neoconservative Foreign Policy. Social Affairs Unit. ISBN 978-1780227955.
- John Luik, Patrick Basham, Gio Gori (2006). Diet Nation: Exposing the Obesity Crusade. Social Affairs Unit. ISBN 978-1904863199.
