= Alex Zamalin =

American educator, political scientist

- Born: U.S.
- Occupations: Educator, political scientist, social scientist, author
- Known for: Black studies, political theory

Alex Zamalin is an American educator, political scientist, social scientist, and author. He is a professor of Africana studies and political science at Rutgers University in New Jersey. He has written numerous books on political theory, race, and American culture. He formerly worked as an associate professor of political science and the director of the African American Studies Program at the University of Detroit Mercy in Detroit, Michigan.

== Publications ==
- Zamalin, Alex (2015). African American Political Thought and American Culture: The Nation's Struggle for Racial Justice. Palgrave Macmillan US. ISBN 9781349553099.
- Zamalin, Alex (2017). Struggle on their Minds: The Political Thought of African American Resistance. Columbia University Press.
- Zamalin, Alex (March 19, 2019). Antiracism: An Introduction. NYU Press. ISBN 9781479849284.
- Zamalin, Alex (2019). Black Utopia: The History of an Idea from Black Nationalism to Afrofuturism. Columbia University Press.
- Zamalin, Alex (2021). Against Civility: The Hidden Racism in Our Obsession with Civility. Boston, Massachusetts: Beacon Press. ISBN 9780807026540.
- Zamalin, Alex (April 12, 2022). All is Not Lost: 20 Ways to Revolutionize Disaster. Boston, Massachusetts: Beacon Press. ISBN 9780807006092.
- Olson, Alix; Zamalin, Alex (January 2, 2024). The Ends of Resistance: Making and Unmaking Democracy. Columbia University Press. ISBN 9780231555784.
- Zamalin, Alex (January 9, 2025). BlacKkKlansman: Movies Minute by Minute. Bloomsbury Publishing. ISBN 9798765103838.
- Zamalin, Alex (February 4, 2025). Counterculture: The Story of America from Bohemia to Hip-Hop. Boston, Massachusetts: Beacon Press. ISBN 9780807045190.
