= Institute for American Values =

American nonprofit organization

- Motto: "Renew civil society"
- Established: 1988
- President: David Blankenhorn
- Budget: Revenue: $559,887; Expenses: $626,271 (FYE February 2017)
- Website: https://instituteforamericanvalues.org/

The Institute for American Values was a New York City think tank focused on family and social issues.

The Institute’s mission was “to study and strengthen civil society.” Within the focus on civil society, the institute’s priorities included marriage, thrift, and public conversation.

== Braver Angels ==
Braver Angels (originally Better Angels) is a non-profit formerly associated with IAV working to depolarize US politics. Founded shortly after the 2016 presidential election, the organization runs workshops, debates, and other events where red (conservative) and blue (liberal) participants come to better understand each other's positions and discover their shared values. The name Better Angels was inspired by Lincoln's plea for national unity at the close of his first inaugural address. The name was changed to Braver Angels in 2020 pursuant to a trademark infringement suit.
