= Conservative Christian Fellowship =

Christian organisation within the British Conservative Party

- Full name: Conservative Christian Fellowship
- Short name: CCF
- Founded: 1990
- Headquarters: Conservative Campaign HQ; 4 Matthew Parker Street, London, SW1H 9HQ, England
- Ideology: Conservatism; Economic liberalism British unionism Christian democracy
- Political position: Centre-right
- National affiliation: Conservative Party

Website
- www.theccf.co.uk

The Conservative Christian Fellowship (CCF) is an organisation working within the British Conservative Party.

== Organisation ==
The CCF's headquarters are at the Conservative Campaign Headquarters in Westminster, but it is funded solely by its supporters. Its previous executive directors include Gareth Wallace, Tim Montgomerie, Paul Woolley, Elizabeth Berridge and Colin Bloom. As of June 2026, its current parliamentary director is David Burrowes.

== Bibliography ==
- Steven, Martin (9 December 2010). Christianity and Party Politics: Keeping the Faith. Routledge. ISBN 978-1-136-84839-1.
- New Statesman. New Statesman Limited. April 2010. p. 35.
- The Freethinker. G.W. Foote. 2000.
