= Digby Anderson =

English journalist

- Born: Digby C. Anderson
- Occupations: journalist; author; think-tank director; Church of England priest
- Known for: Founding director of the Social Affairs Unit
- Notable work: All Oiks Now

Digby C. Anderson (born 25 May 1944) is the founder and former director (until 2004) of the Social Affairs Unit, a public policy organisation/economic think-tank created in 1980. In addition to this role, Anderson served as a long-time contributor to several conservative American and British newspapers and magazines including The Spectator and The Daily Telegraph, as well as The American Spectator, The New Criterion, and National Review.

== Career ==
Anderson founded the Social Affairs Unit, a British public policy organisation that developed from the Institute of Economic Affairs and became independent within a few years. He stepped down as director of the organisation in 2004 after 24 years.

Alongside his work at the Social Affairs Unit, Anderson contributed to and edited conservative American and British publications including The Spectator, The Daily Telegraph, The New Criterion and National Review. He is also an ordained priest in the Church of England.

== Writing and reception ==
Anderson's writing has focused on social norms, manners, public behaviour and cultural change in Britain. His 2004 book All Oiks Now: The Unnoticed Surrender of Middle England was published by the Social Affairs Unit and reviewed in The Guardian. Stephen Moss described the book as an "extended pamphlet-cum-provocation" and discussed its criticism of changing class attitudes and social behaviour in contemporary Britain.

== Books ==
- Anderson, Digby, Charles Moore, and Michael Heath, The English At Table, Social Affairs Unit, 2006. ISBN 1-904863-18-3
- Anderson, Digby, Decadence: The Passing of Personal Virtue and Its Replacement by Political and Psychological Slogans, Social Affairs Unit, 2005.
- Anderson, Digby, All Oiks Now: The Unnoticed Surrender of Middle England, Social Affairs Unit, 2004.
- Anderson, Digby and Mullen, Peter (eds), Called to Account: The Case for an Audit of the State of the Failing Church of England, Social Affairs Unit, 2003.
- Anderson, Digby (ed), The War on Wisdom, Social Affairs Unit, 2002
- Anderson, Digby, Losing Friends, Social Affairs Unit, 2001.
- Anderson, Digby, The Dictionary of Dangerous Words, Social Affairs Unit, 2000
- Anderson, Digby and Mullen, Peter (eds), Faking it: the Sentimentalisation of Modern Society, Penguin Books, 1998.
- Anderson, Digby and Mosbacher, Michael (eds), British Woman Today: A Qualitative Survey of Images in Women's Magazines, Social Affairs Unit, 1997.
- Anderson, Digby (ed), Health, Lifestyle and Environment: Countering the Panic, Social Affairs Unit, 1991
- Anderson, Digby, Drinking to Your Health: The Allegations and the Evidence, Social Affairs Unit, 1989
- Anderson, Digby (ed), Full Circle?: Bringing Up Children in the Post-permissive Society, Social Affairs Unit, 1988
- Anderson, Digby, The Spectator Book of Imperative Cooking, George G. Harrap and Co., 1987
- Anderson, Digby, A Diet of Reason: Sense and Nonsense in the Healthy Eating Debate, Social Affairs Unit, 1986
- Anderson, Digby, Kindness That Kills: Churches' Simplistic Response to Complex Social Issues, SPCK Publications, 1984
