= Jan Hondong =

Dutch aviator (1893-1968)

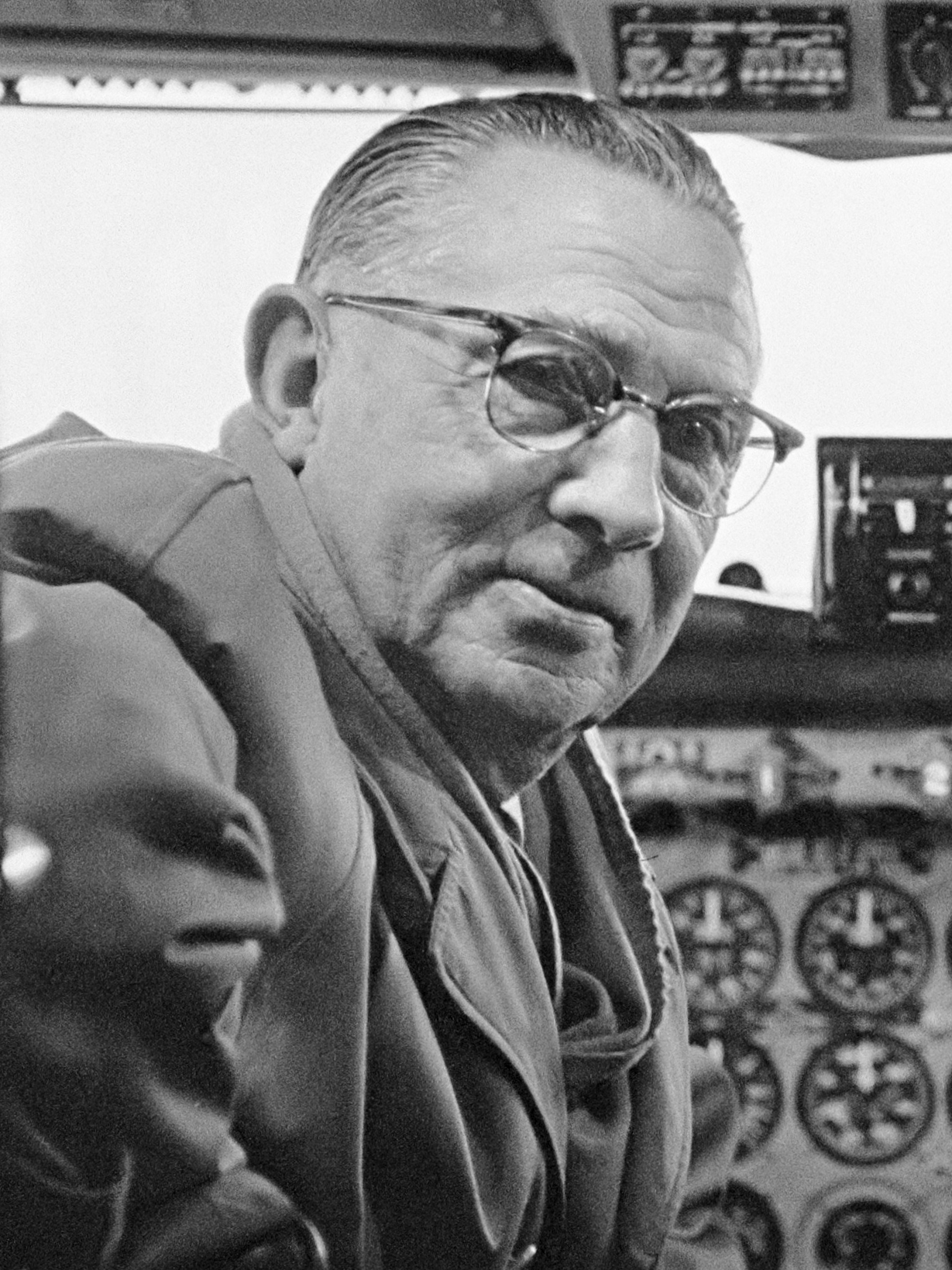
- Hondong in 1959
- Born: Jacobus Johannes Hondong; 10 July 1893; Grave, Netherlands
- Died: 14 June 1968 (aged 74); Ede, Netherlands
- Occupations: Aviator, KLM pilot, Aviation Pioneer

Jacobus Johannes "Jan" Hondong (10 July 1893 – 14 June 1968) was a Dutch pilot and aviation pioneer who worked for KLM Royal Dutch Airlines. He is best known as the captain of the historic Christmas flight of the Fokker F.XVIII aircraft, the Snip, to the Dutch West Indies in December 1934. This flight laid the foundation for the KLM West-Indisch Bedrijf.

== Biography ==
=== Early life and career ===
Jan Hondong earned his military pilot's license on 12 July 1921, with the Dutch Luchtvaartafdeeling. He joined KLM on 18 February 1925. His first flight to the Dutch East Indies took place in 1929.

=== The 1934 Christmas Flight ===
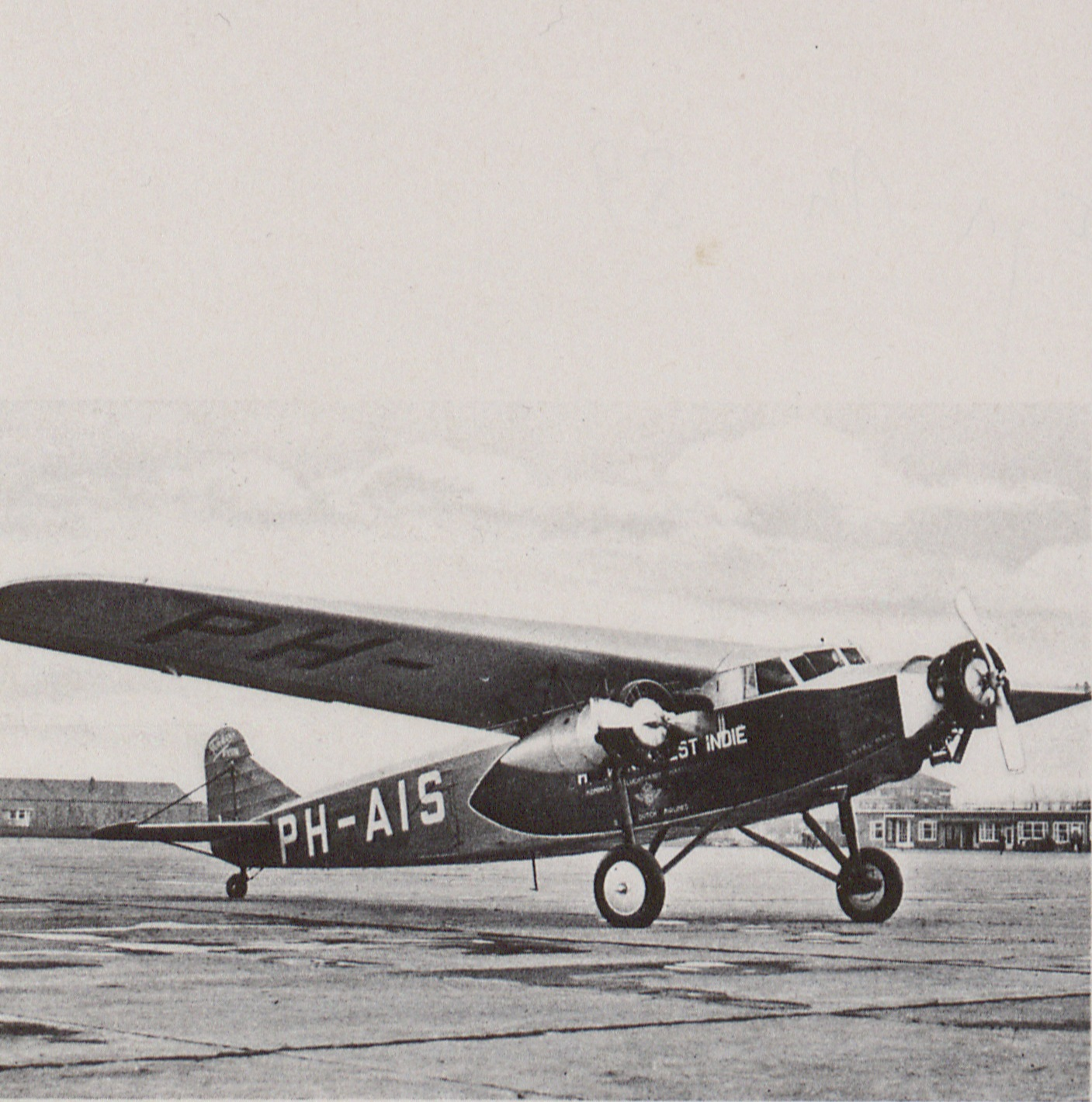
The Fokker F.XVIII named Snip (PH-AIS) in 1933

In 1934, KLM outfitted a Fokker F.XVIII named Snip (PH-AIS) with six additional fuel tanks to enable a transatlantic crossing. Hondong, with co-pilot Jan J. van Balkom, radio operator Simon van de Molen, and flight engineer Leonardus D. Stolk, flew via Marseille, Alicante, Casablanca, and Porto Praia to Paramaribo in just 17 hours. On 22 December, they arrived at Hato Airport in Curaçao via La Guaira, Venezuela. The flight was a major success, and all crew members received Royal honors for their achievement. However, the triumph was overshadowed by the 1934 KLM Douglas DC-2 crash, the crash of the Douglas DC-2 Uiver on 20 December 1934.

=== Later flights ===
In 1935, Hounding was involved in the 1935 KLM Bushehr incident; an accident with the DC-2 PH-AKM Maraboe on the return leg from the Dutch East Indies. The aircraft's landing gear was damaged during takeoff from a rough airstrip in Bushehr, resulting in a crash and fire. All passengers survived, but the aircraft and most of the mail was lost.

In October 1936, Hondong participated in a race involving American journalists Herbert "Bud" Ekins, Leo Kieran, and Dorothy Kilgallen, who aimed to travel around the world in 20 days. Ekins flew part of the route aboard a KLM plane piloted by Hondong, ultimately reaching Batavia faster than his competitors, who traveled with Imperial Airways.

On the evening of the German invasion of the Netherlands in 1940, Hondong and fellow pilots Willem van Veenendaal and Adriaan Viruly planned a flight to England to avoid remaining in occupied territory. However, KLM's director Albert Plesman intervened and the plan was cancelled.

=== Postwar years ===
In the 1950s, Hondong worked in air traffic control at Amsterdam Schiphol Airport. He retired in 1955.

== Legacy and honors ==
- On 18 May 2002, a relief sculpture was unveiled on the corner of Bagijnenstraat and Hoofschestraat in Grave, on the wall of his childhood home, created by sculptor Jan Ketterings.
- In 2004, a short film was produced in Curaçao about the 1934 Snip flight. Part of it was filmed at the Curaçao Museum in Otrobanda, Willemstad, where since 1992 the restored cockpit of the Snip has been on display. Hondong was portrayed by helicopter pilot and author George S.D. Tielen.
- Streets have been named after Hondong in Beverwijk and 's-Hertogenbosch; and a city park in Grave.
