= 1935 Bushehr KLM Douglas DC-2 crash =

1935 aviation accident in Iran

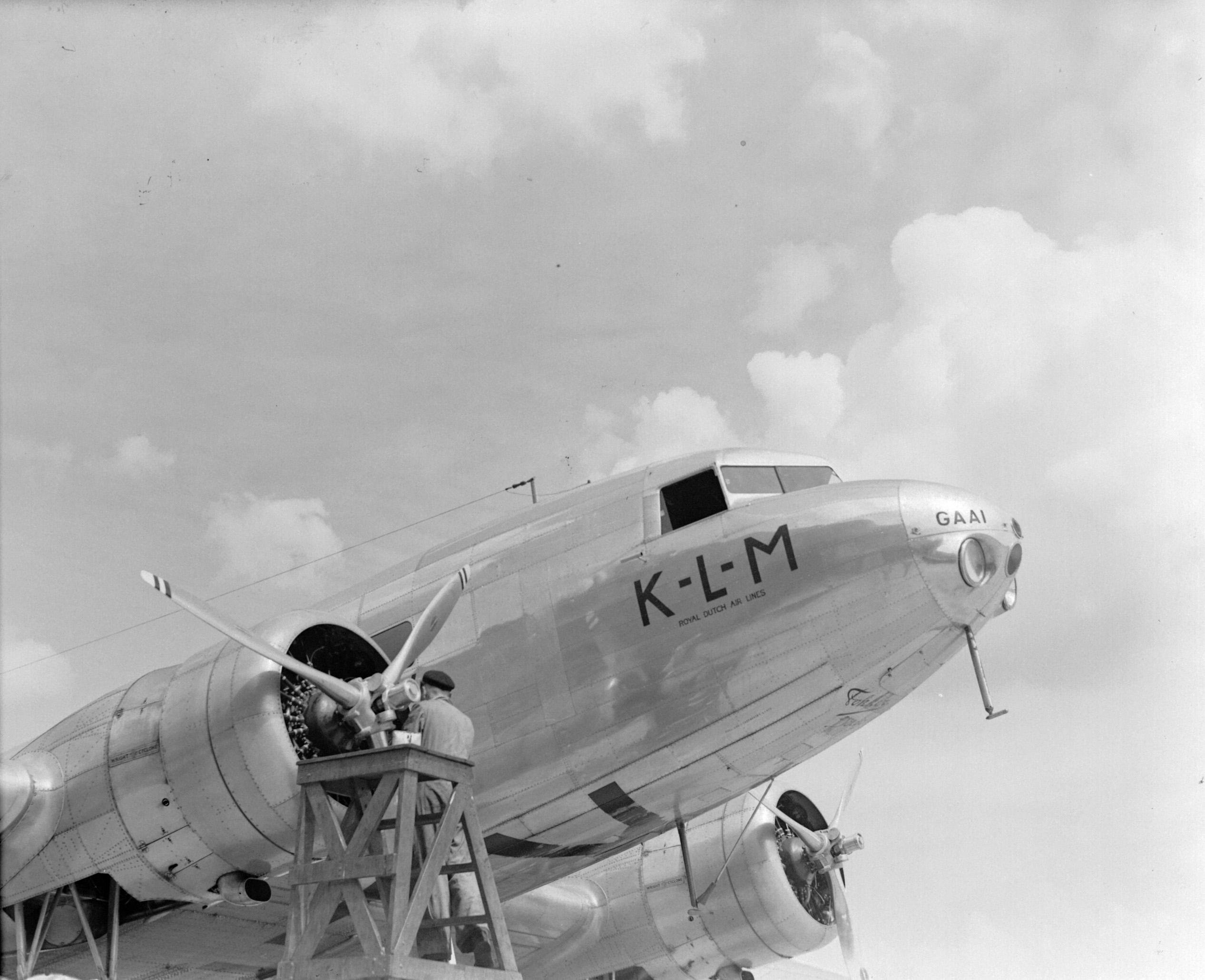
- Identical airplane as the involved airplane

Accident
- Date: 17 July 1935
- Site: Bushehr, Iran

Aircraft
- Aircraft type: Douglas DC-2
- Operator: KLM
- Registration: PH-AKM
- Flight origin: Batavia, Dutch East Indies
- Stopover: Medang, Dutch East Indies
- 2nd stopover: Rangoon, Myanmar
- 3rd stopover: Jodhpur, India
- 4th stopover: Bushire, Iran
- 5th stopover: Baghdad, Iraq
- Destination: Amsterdam, Netherlands
- Occupants: 12
- Passengers: 8
- Crew: 4
- Fatalities: 0
- Injuries: 0
- Survivors: 12

On 17 July 1935, the day after it had made an emergency landing, the KLM Douglas DC-2 aircraft, crashed during takeoff from Bushire in Iran. All passengers and crew survived without injury. The aircraft, registration PH-AKM, had been flying from Batavia, Dutch East Indies (now Jakarta in Indonesia), with a final scheduled destination of Schiphol, Amsterdam, in the Netherlands. The accident was one of three major international passenger flight accidents of KLM that week and became known as the "black week". This left KLM short of crew and airplanes.

== Flight and accident ==
The Douglas DC-2 PH-AKM (named: "Maraboe") operated by KLM departed on Saturday 13 July 1935 from Batavia, Dutch East Indies, via several stopovers including Medang, Rangoon, Jodhpur and Bagdad to Amsterdam, the Netherlands. Due to bad weather the airplane made an emergency landing in Bushire, Iran, in the evening of 16 July 1935. In the early morning of 17 July 1935 (12.30 u. GMT) the airplane departed to continue its journey to the next intermediate stop in Baghdad, Iraq. The runway of Bushire was not good, described as a very bumpy grass field and was the worst runway on the route from the Dutch East Indies to the Netherlands. The airplane took off in darkness. The track was illuminated with stable lanterns. After around 300 meters with a speed of around 120 km/h the airplane bumped into a hole and jumped as a result of that around three meters into the air. According to an eye witness the plane had enough speed to stay in the air. However, the plane flipped hard back onto the runway. The impact caused the right landing gear to retract and damaged parts of the wing, including fuel lines. The airplane was leaning slightly to the right and came to a stop. Due to the fuel that poured out, or due to back-fire of a sudden stop of the engine the plane caught fire. The passengers and crew were able to leave the aircraft unharmed. The pilot didn’t turn off the engines and didn’t close the fuel tap. Besides of that the Lux fire extinguishing system was not used. The rear part of the aircraft burned down completely and most of the luggage and mail bags were lost.

== Aftermath ==
=== Telegram misunderstandings ===
Because the telegram services in Bushehr were closed, Hondong sent telegrams to the Netherlands to report the accident from Reishahr, a small town a few miles away at the Persian Gulf coast. The fact that the telegram came from Reishahr caused misunderstandings at KLM. KLM thought that the airplane had landed on the beach at Reishahr. There was even a wild story that passengers and some crew members were taken to Bushehr by camel while Hondong and the flight engineer remained behind with the aircraft. The plane then crashed during an attempt to take off from the beach the next morning.

=== Return of crew and passengers ===
The DC-2 PH-AKR "Rietvink", with pilot Koene Dirk Parmentier, departed from Schiphol to pick up Hondong and passengers and fly them to Amsterdam. There was a great welcome after the Rietvink returned at Schiphol. The excitement was only contained because at that moment it became known that the 1935 San Giacomo Douglas DC-2 crash had occurred.

=== Mail recovery ===
A total of 25 kg mail of the original 116 kg was saved. A part of this mail was delivered by the Dutch PTT in service envelopes with stenciled text. These envelopes have become very valuable for philatelists.

== The aircraft ==
The American-built Douglas DC-2 PH-AKM, named "Maraboe", was delivered by Douglas to KLM on 22 April 1935 and shipped from New York to Cherbourg. There it arrived on 10 May 1935. Four days later, on 14 May the plane arrived at Amsterdam. On 4 May 1935, the aircraft was registered in the Dutch civil aviation register. It was the 8th of 16 DC-2 airplanes for KLM. Starting on 30 May 1935, the airplane had done only one return flight to the Dutch East.

== Passengers and crew ==
There were four crew members and eight passengers on board.

=== Crew ===
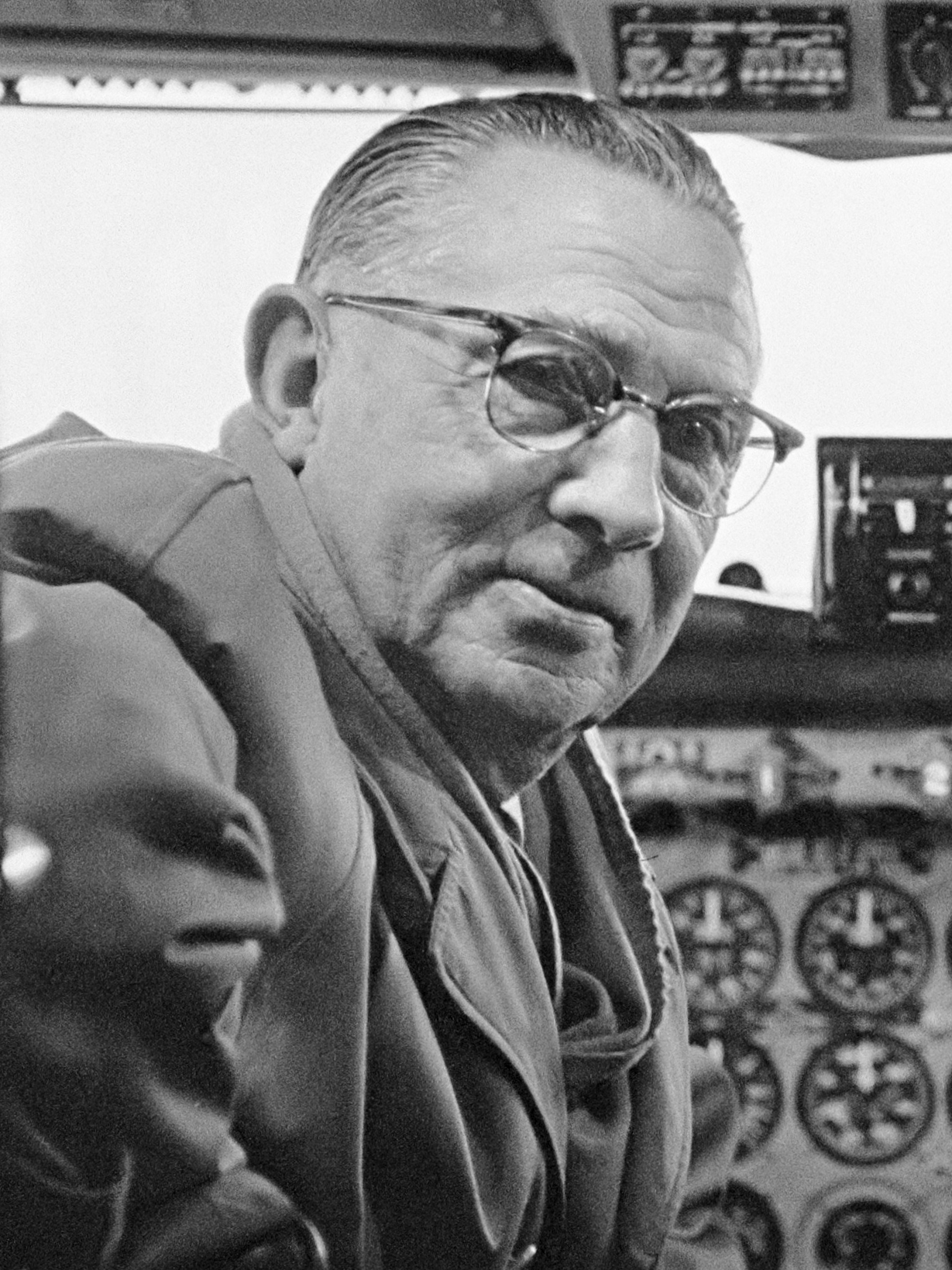
Pilot Jan Hondong

- Jan Hondong (10 July 1893 — 14 June 1968) was the pilot. He was the pilot of the famous flight with the Snip to the Dutch East Indies, from 15 to 29 December 1934. This was also the foundation of the KLM West-Indisch Bedrijf.
- K.J. Freiherr von Rüpplin Keffikon was the second pilot
- M. Veenendaal was the flight engineer
- H.H. v.d. Smagt was the radio operator

=== Passengers ===
- Van Westreenen, he worked at Koninklijke Paketvaart-Maatschappij in Palembang
- Derk Jacobus Eeuwens (January 8, 1908 — December 4, 1982). He worked for Lindeteves, an exporter of machinery and other supplies from Europe and the U.S.A. to Indonesia. Eeuwens saved the baby from the burning plane.
- Theodoor Enne Stufkens (born 23 January 1885 in Rotterdam — September 1944). He was editor-in-chief of De Preangerbode between 1906 and 1921. He emigrated on 17 July 1926 to the United States. Later he lived in The Hague and Bandoeng. He was industrialist of a canning factory. He traveled to the Netherlands to visit family. Stufkens went missing after the Jun'yō Maru where he was on, was attacked by the Japanese on 18 September 1944. He died on 22 September 1944.
- Van den Broeke, he lived in Batavia.
- Madam Ottens was the wife of the KLM hotelier in Djask and travelled with her 6-month old baby.
- British luitenant Henry M. Bromilow. He lived in Karachi
- British miss M.G. Kennedy, lived also in Karachi.

== Black week and consequences ==
The accident was the second out of three major airplane accidents in one week after the crash of the "Kwikstaart" in Amsterdam and before the "Gaai" in Pian San Giacomo. The week of 14 to 20 July 1935 is known as the "black week". In these three crashes KLM lost three airplanes and lost crew in two crashes. As a result the KLM had to deal with a shortage of crew members and airplanes.

== Investigation ==
The investigation was carried out by the Dutch Government Study Service for Aviation (Rijksstudiedienst voor de Luchtvaart) and led by van der Maas (Rijks-Studiedienst voor de Luchtvaart) and van der Heijden (Rijksluchtvaartdienst).

Immediately after arrival at Schiphol, all crew member were officially questioned by van der Heijden and van der Maas. Afterwards the crew reported to KLM director Albert Plesman, deputy director Guillonard and flight chief Aler.

Some statements of the crew members differed from each other, especially the estimated speed varies of the airplane at the time of the jump. The question remains whether the aircraft already had sufficient speed and could therefore have remained in the air or not.
