= Nelson Frank =

American journalist

Julian Nelson Frank (1906–1974) was a journalist for the New York World-Telegram, an anti-communist special agent with U.S. Naval Intelligence, and an investigator for the Senate Internal Security Subcommittee.

== Career ==
Frank was a writer, labor editor, and columnist for the New York World-Telegram from 1944 to 1955, where his 1945 article concerning the Duclos letter, which contributed to the ouster of Communist Party USA head Earl Browder. Frank also wrote for Life and Fortune.

With Norton Mockridge, Frank's front-page World-Telegram exposé "Red Ring Bared by Blond Queen" (written with Norton Mockridge) did much to popularize the story of "Red Spy Queen" Elizabeth Bentley; he appeared with her on one of the first episodes of Meet the Press. A former communist who had worked for The Daily Worker, Frank testified before Rep. Richard Nixon and HUAC to support Whittaker Chambers's accusations against Alger Hiss.

Later, Frank became a bookstore owner.

== Personal life and death ==
Frank was the father of Johanna Hurwitz and the grandfather of Vanessa Ruta, Garance Franke-Ruta, and Ted Frank.

== Works ==
Articles with Norton Mockridge include:

- "Red Ring Bared by Blond Queen" (July 21, 1948)
- "Super-Secrecy Veiled Russia's Spy Cells Here" (July 22, 1948)
- "Citizens Tricked into Spy Ring by U.S. Reds" (July 23, 1948)
- "Commie Chieftains Ordered Budenz to Aid Red Spy Queen" (July 26, 1948)

== See also ==
- New York World-Telegram
- Elizabeth Bentley
- Frederick Woltman
- Norton Mockridge
