= Norton Mockridge =

Norton Mockridge (September 29, 1915 – April 18, 2004) was an American journalist, newspaper editor, syndicated columnist who helped break the Elizabeth Bentley Soviet spy story in 1948 and whom the New York Times called "a jack-of-all-trades: New York newspaper man, humorist, columnist and author."

== Background ==
Norton A. Mockridge was born on September 29, 1915, in the Bronx. His father Frank Walter Mockridge was a New York Telephone Company executive; his mother was Fredricka Apfel. Mockridge went to high school in Mount Kisco.

== Career ==
In 1933, Mockridge started work as a reporter for the weekly Mount Kisco Recorder. In 1936, he joined The White Plains Daily Reporter, where he became a critic and city editor. In 1940, he joined The New York World-Telegram. In 1942 during World War II, he joined the U.S. Army and rose to first lieutenant.

On July 21, 1948, the World-Telegram published a front-page article co-written with Nelson Frank called "Red Ring Bared by Blond Queen." The subject was an as-yet unnamed, Mata Hari-like Soviet ex-spy. On July 29, 1948, this unnamed ex-spy would come forward and testify before a Senate investigation committee and again on July 31, 1948, before the House Un-American Activities Committee (HUAC). The spy's name was Elizabeth Bentley.

In 1956, Mockridge became city editor of The World-Telegram & Sun. In 1963, while he was editor, the newspaper won a Pulitzer Prize for local reporting on a plane crash in Jamaica Bay.

From 1963 to 1964, Mockridge hosted of a daily WCBS radio show, thereafter expanded to the CBS Radio Network until 1970.

Mockridge was a columnist for The World-Telegram from 1963 to 1966, then syndicated by Scripps-Howard Newspapers and United Feature Syndicate from 1966 until 1980.

== Personal life and death ==
Mockridge married Margaret Eleanor Gleason; after 15 years of marriage and three children, they divorced in 1961. In 1963, he married Valborg Palmer.

In 1978, Mockridge filed an age-discrimination lawsuit against Scripps-Howard Newspapers, settled out of court.

Mockridge, a humorist, cited "hundreds of mutations" of his name, including "Gordon Mockowitz," "Morton Muckeridge," and "Gordon Muskrotch." If asked whether "Norton Mockridge" was really his name, he would answer, "You think I'd make it up?"

Mockridge died age 88 on April 18, 2004, of pneumonia in San Antonio, Texas.

== Awards ==
- 1949: Christopher Award
- 1963: Pulitzer Prize (with World Telegram city staff)
- 1974: Jesse H. Neal certificate of merit

== Works ==
Books include:

- This Is Costello (with Robert H. Prall) (1951)
- The Big Fix (with Robert H. Prall) (1954)
- Costello on the Spot (1957)
- Fractured English (1965)
- A Funny Thing Happened (1966)
- Mockridge, You're Slipping (1967)
- Scrawl of the Wild: What People Write on Walls and Why (1968)

Articles with Nelson Frank include:

- "Red Ring Bared by Blond Queen" (July 21, 1948)
- "Super-Secrecy Veiled Russia's Spy Cells Here" (July 22, 1948)
- "Citizens Tricked into Spy Ring by U.S. Reds" (July 23, 1948)
- "Commie Chieftains Ordered Budenz to Aid Red Spy Queen" (July 26, 1948)

== See also ==
- Nelson Frank
- Elizabeth Bentley

== External sources ==
- Norton Mockridge at IMDb
- Channel 13
