= Around the World in 20 Days =

1936 aviation race

- Dates: 30 September–19 October 1936

Around the World in 20 Days was an informal race around the world held in autumn of 1936. The competition started on 30 September in New York City and the participants were allowed to use only commercial airline flights and other means of transport available to the general public. The competition finished on 19 October as the winner arrived back in New York City after merely 18 1/2 days.

== Background ==
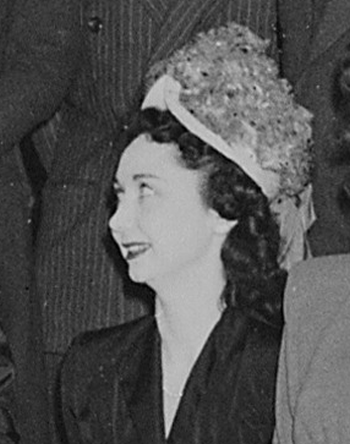
Kilgallen

The purpose of the contest was to show that travel by air no longer was exclusive, time consuming and expensive but was accessible and affordable to the broader public. Earlier around-the-world trips such as the fictive journey in Jules Verne's Around the World in Eighty Days published in 1873 and Nellie Bly's actual 1889 journey later described in Around the World in Seventy-Two Days published in 1890 were made before the introduction of aircraft.

The timing of the race was handled by the National Aeronautic Association and the race started on the evening of 30 September.

== The Contestants ==
All participants were working as journalists at daily newspapers in New York.

- Herbert Roslyn "Bud" Ekins, of the New York World-Telegram.
- Leo Kieran, of The New York Times.
- Dorothy Kilgallen, of the New York Evening Journal.

During the race all three participants sent daily dispatches by telegram about the journey to their respective newspapers for further distribution. Kilgallen's participation drew much attention because she was the only female participant.

== The Race ==
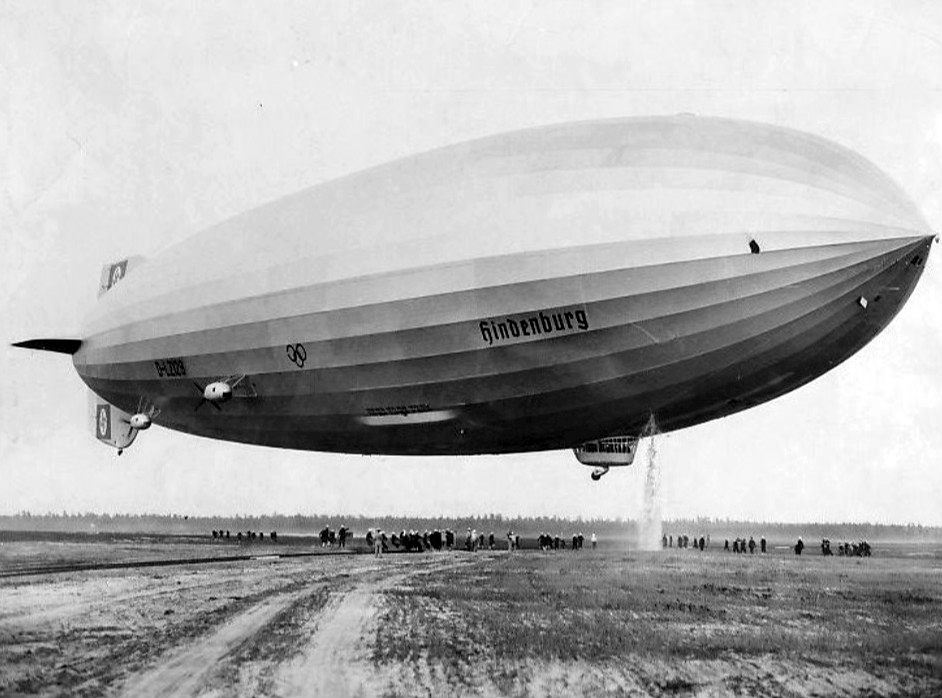
airship Hindenburg

The race started on 30 September, Kieran went to Newark Airport to take an American Airlines flight to Lakehurst in New Jersey. There all three participants joined on the Deutsche Zeppelin-Reederei rigid airship LZ 129 Hindenburg for the flight to Flug- und Luftschiffhafen Rhein-Main in Frankfurt, Germany. The journey across the Atlantic Ocean took 58 hours and the Hindenburg landed on 3 October, but being 4 hours delayed, the participants all missed their planned connections, jeopardizing the crucial connection at Manila they needed to make for their journey across the Pacific Ocean. Ekins now chose a flight to Vienna, Kieran decided on a flight to Basel, and Kilgallen boarded a flight to Munich.

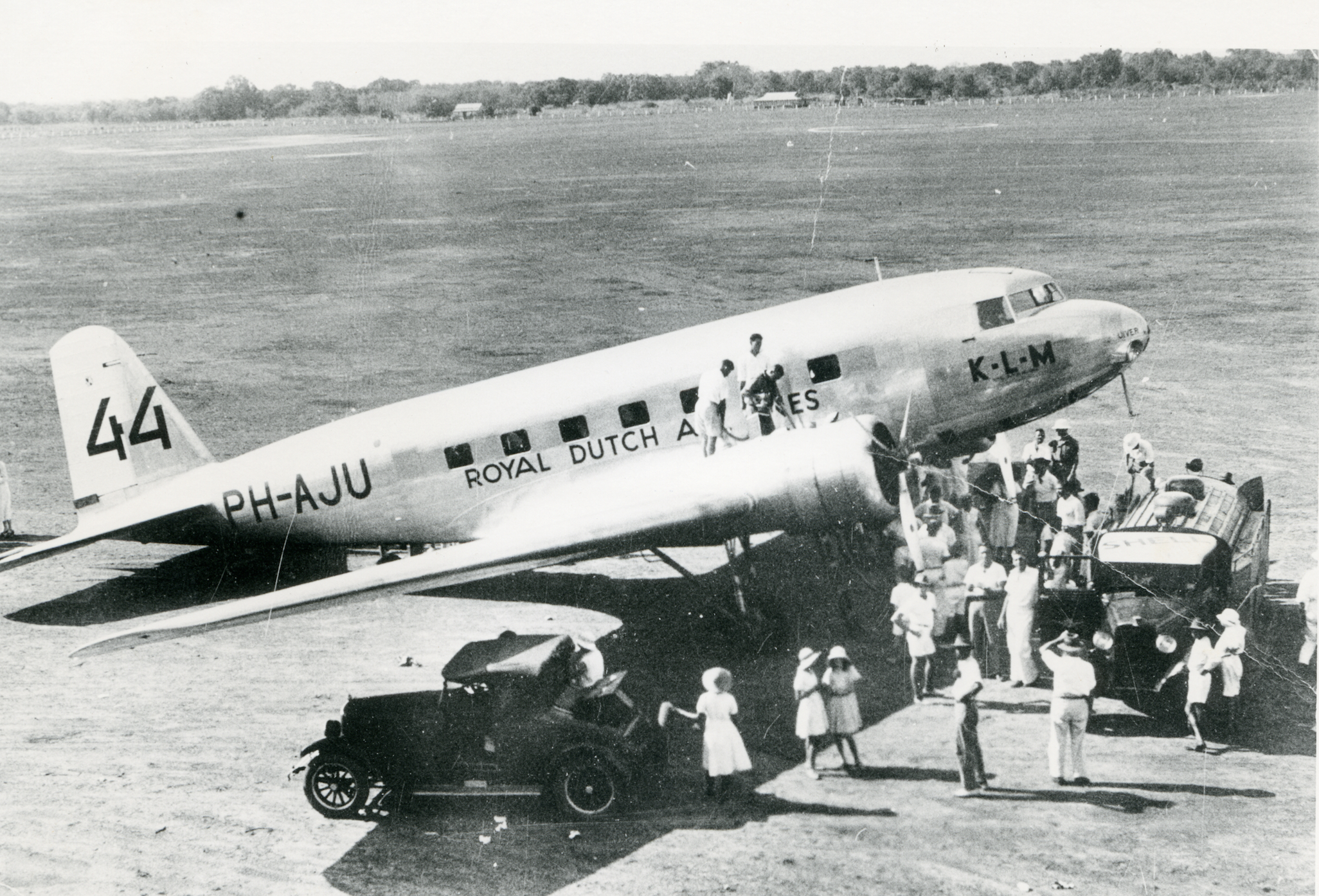
Douglas DC-2, PH-AJU

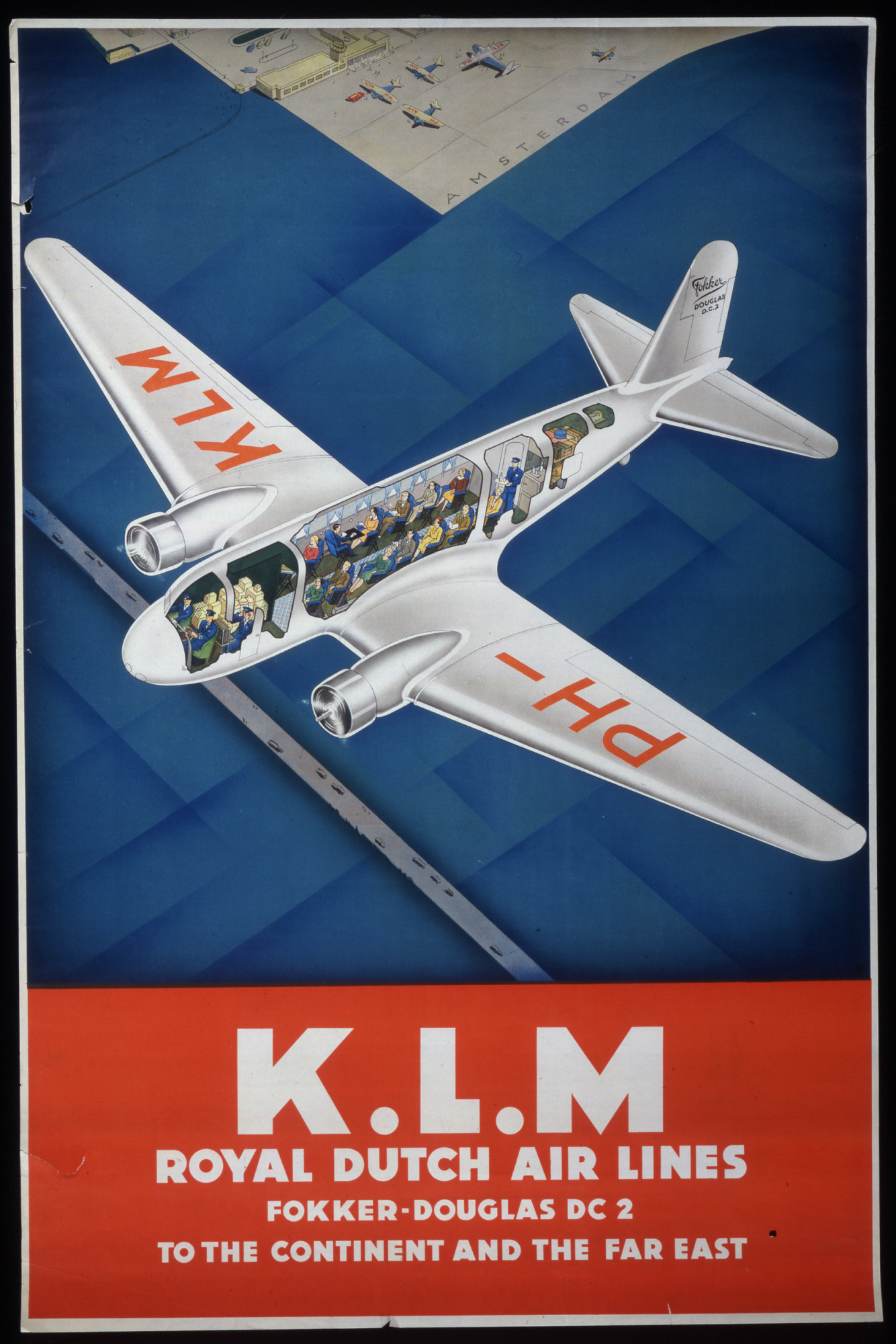
Douglas DC-2, inside

Ekins, now choosing a different route to reach Manila, took a KLM DC-2 flight via Vienna to Athens, Greece, there transferring on to a flight via Alexandria and Gaza to Baghdad, Iraq where he stayed overnight. From Baghdad he continued across the Indian subcontinent (stop-over overnight Jodhpur) and Southeast Asia (stop-over overnight Rangoon) until arriving at Batavia, Dutch East Indies. During this leg of the race some parts of the route were piloted by aviation pioneer Jan Hondong. At Batavia Ekins now switched to the KNILM flight to Manila via Balikpapan, Indonesia and Zamboanga finally arriving in Manila, Philippines on 10 October.

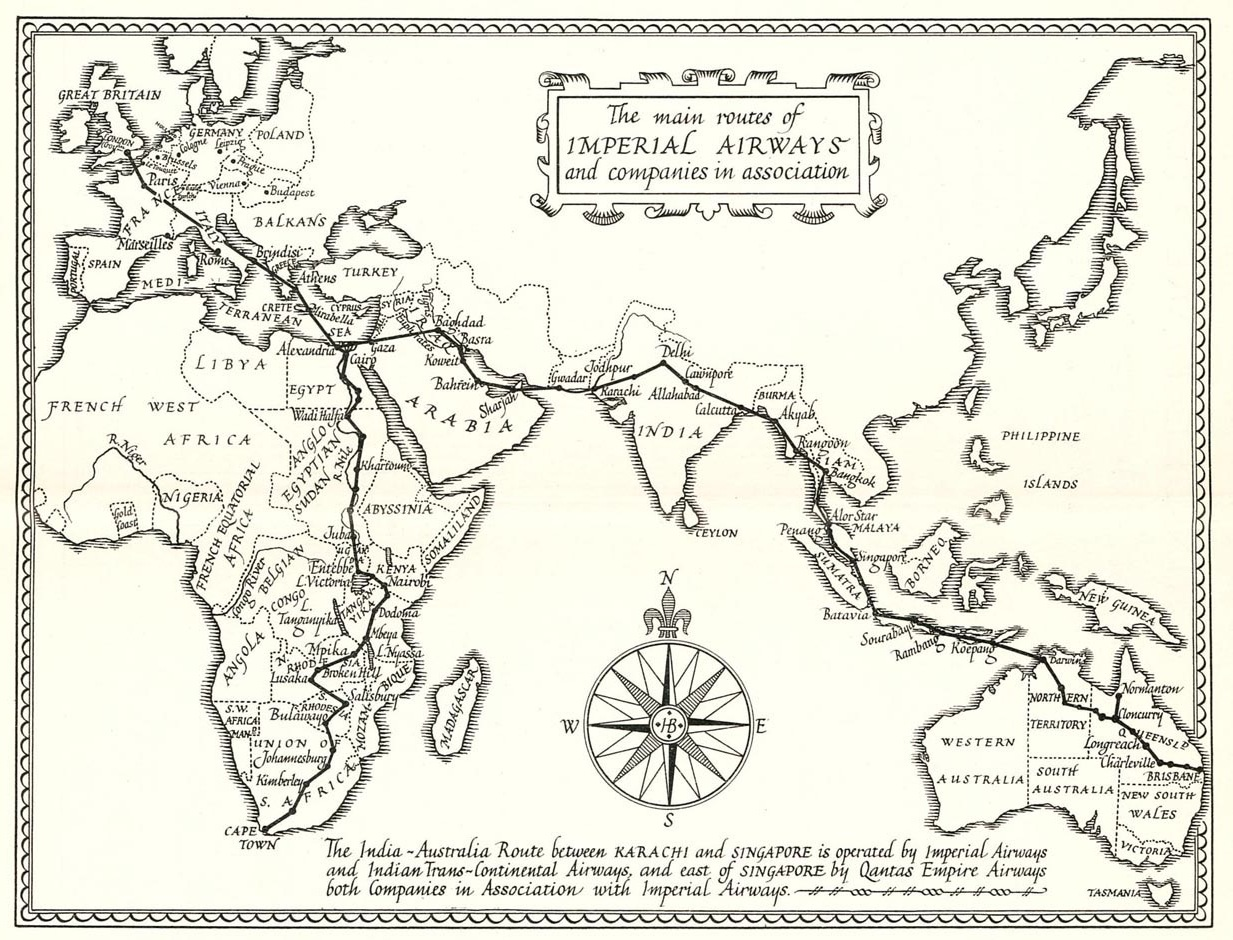
Imperial Airways flightroutes

Kieran and Kilgallen rejoined in Brindisi, Italy after using various means of transport (airplane, train and automobile). Kieran and Kilgallen now boarded a flight to Athens where they switched to an Imperial Airways flight across the Near East (with stop-overs in Rutbah Wells, Basra and Baghdad, Iraq) and across the British Raj (stop-overs Karachi, Jodhpur, Delhi, Calcutta and Rangoon) to Bangkok (at the time Siam). On arrival in Bangkok Kilgallen split from Kieran choosing a different route to reach Hong Kong. On arrival in Hong Kong Kieran and Kilgallen obtained information that Ekins had left Manila already on 14 October on an irregular Pan American Martin M-130 testflight carrying no passengers, the "Hawaii Clipper", by pretending to be part of the crew (even so the route being the same they considered this a violation of the rules). Kieran and Kilgallen left Hongkong on the Dollar Steamship Line steamship SS President Pierce for Manila. Their flight across the Pacific Ocean was scheduled first on 17 October.

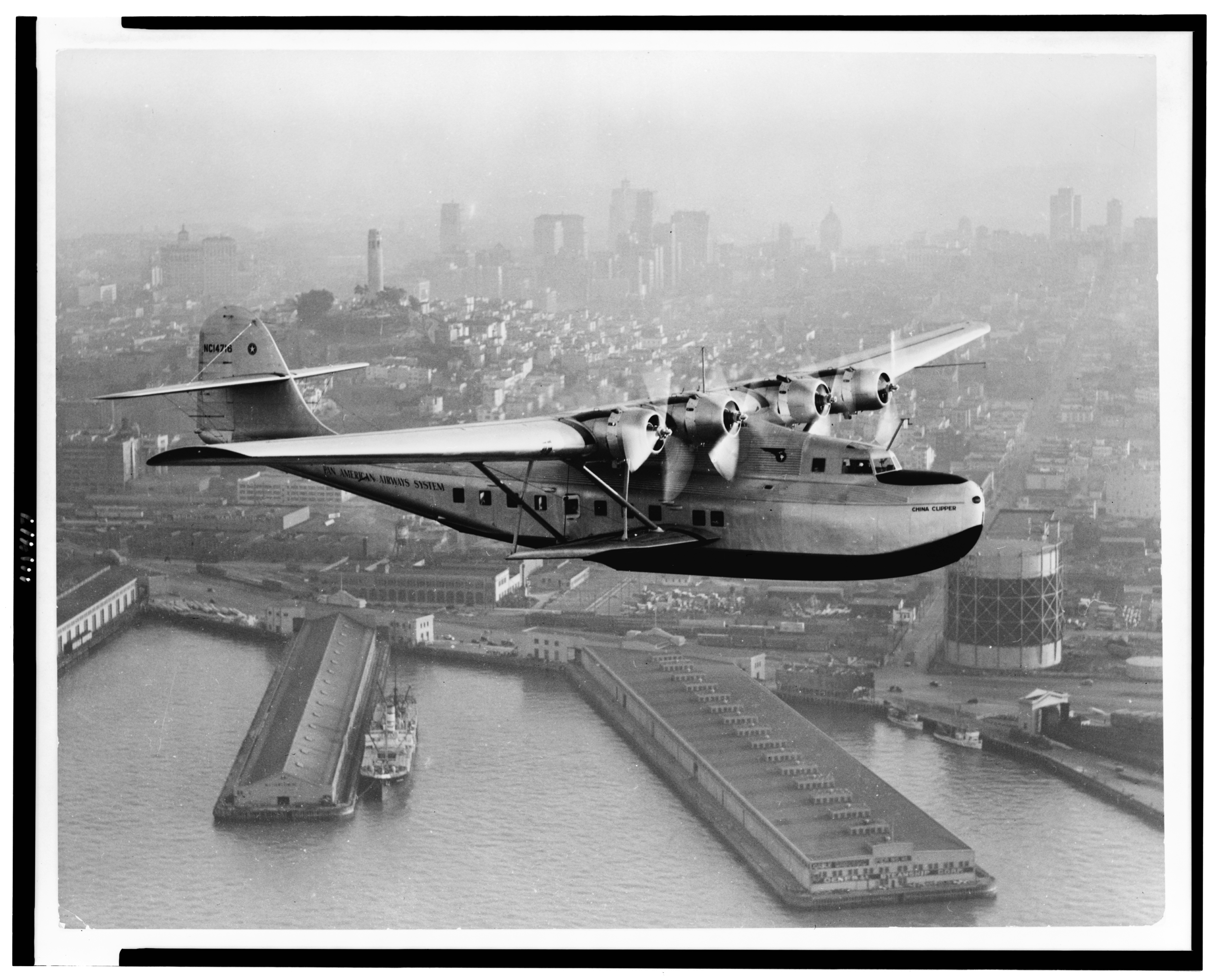
China Clipper

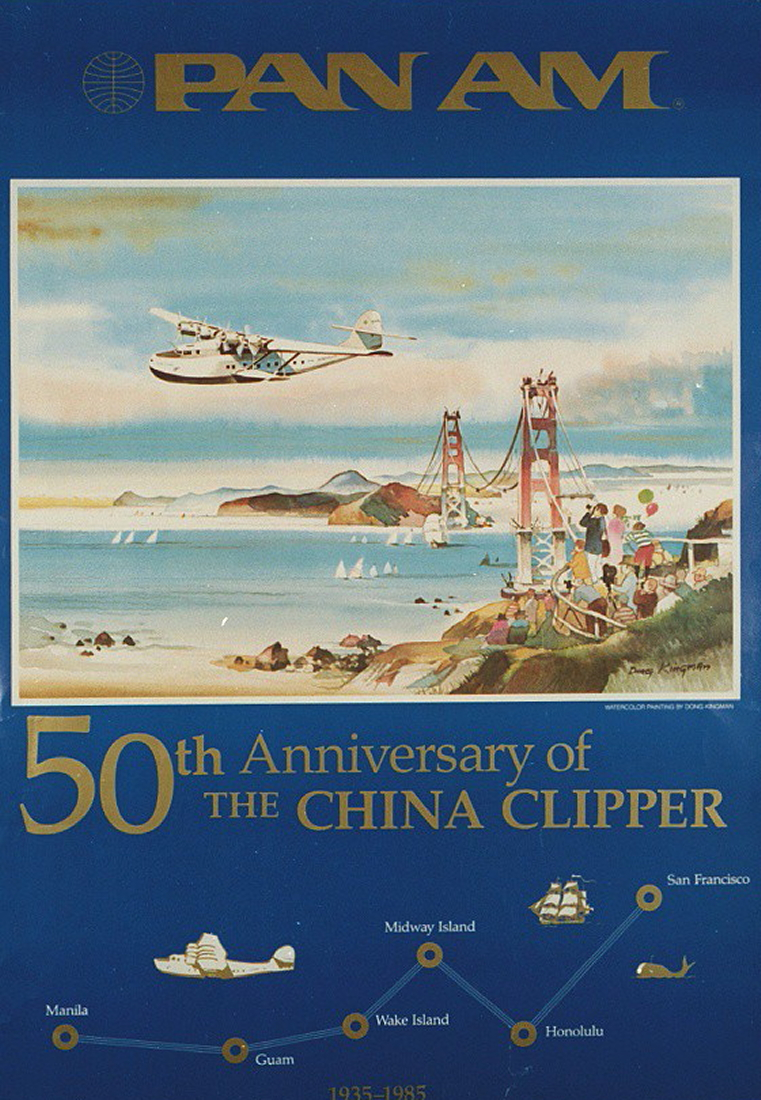
China Clippers flightroutes

Kieran and Kilgallen left Manilla on the first regular Pan American west to east bound passenger flight of the flying boat-line, the Martin M-130 "China Clipper", destined for San Francisco. This long stage included four stop-overs (the islands of Guam, Wake, Midway and Hawaii). During the flight Kieran and Kilgallen were delayed further due to a typhoon at Wake island. The duo arrived in Honolulu on 22 October before continuing to San Francisco.

Ekins had left Hawaii already on 17 October arriving in San Francisco (Alameda airport) on the 18th and there boarding a "United Airlines" flight from Oakland) (1 stop-over) to Los Angeles. After switching to a Trans World Airlines flight (5 stop-overs) Ekins arrived in Newark on 19 October.

In San Francisco Kieran also boarded a United Airlines flight arriving in Newark at 9:07 o'clock a.m. on 25 October and finally reaching The New York Times Building near Times Square at 10:50 o'clock a.m. Kilgallen boarded a chartered flight at Alameda airport leaving one hour ahead of Kieran arriving in Newark at 5:45 o'clock a.m. Kieran however completed the trip around the World using only scheduled airlines and transportation, the journey from Honolulu to Newark Airport by scheduled airlines was a record-breaking trip covering 5 281 mi in 39 hr. and 20 min.

The total distance traveled was calculated to being 25 794 mi (about 41 511 km, the total time traveled for Ekins was 18 days, 14 hr. and 56 min, Kilgallen's amounted to 24 days 12 hr. and 35 min with Kieran finishing at 24 days, 14 hr. and 20 min.

== Aftermath ==
A reception was held for Kieran and Kilgallen at New York City Hall on 26 October hosted by Mayor La Guardia.

Kilgallen wrote a book about the race titled Girl Around the World and published by David McKay Company of Philadelphia in 1936. The book is credited as the story idea for the Warner Bros. Pictures 1937 movie Fly-Away Baby released in the US on 19 June.

Ekins later also wrote a book about the race titled Around the world in eighteen days and how to do it published by Longmans, Green and Co of New York in the same year.

In 2001, the adventure reality competition The Amazing Race first aired in the US.
