= Snip (aircraft) =

Fokker F.XVIII aircraft (1934 to 1946)

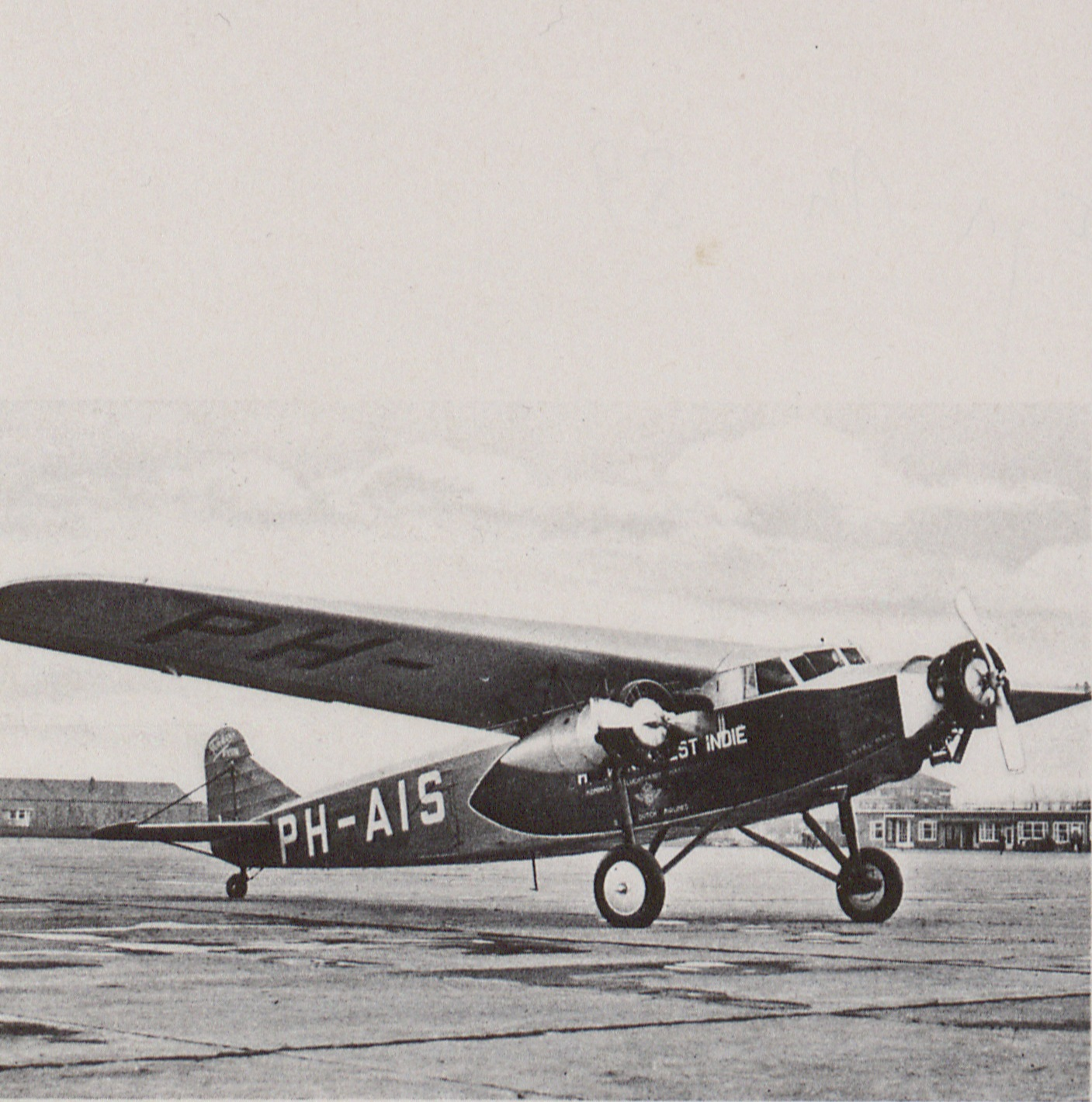
- Snip in 1934

General information
- Type: Transport aircraft
- Manufacturer: Fokker
- Primary user: KLM

History
- Introduction date: 1934
- Retired: 1946

Video of the first transatlantic flight to Curaçao in December 1934

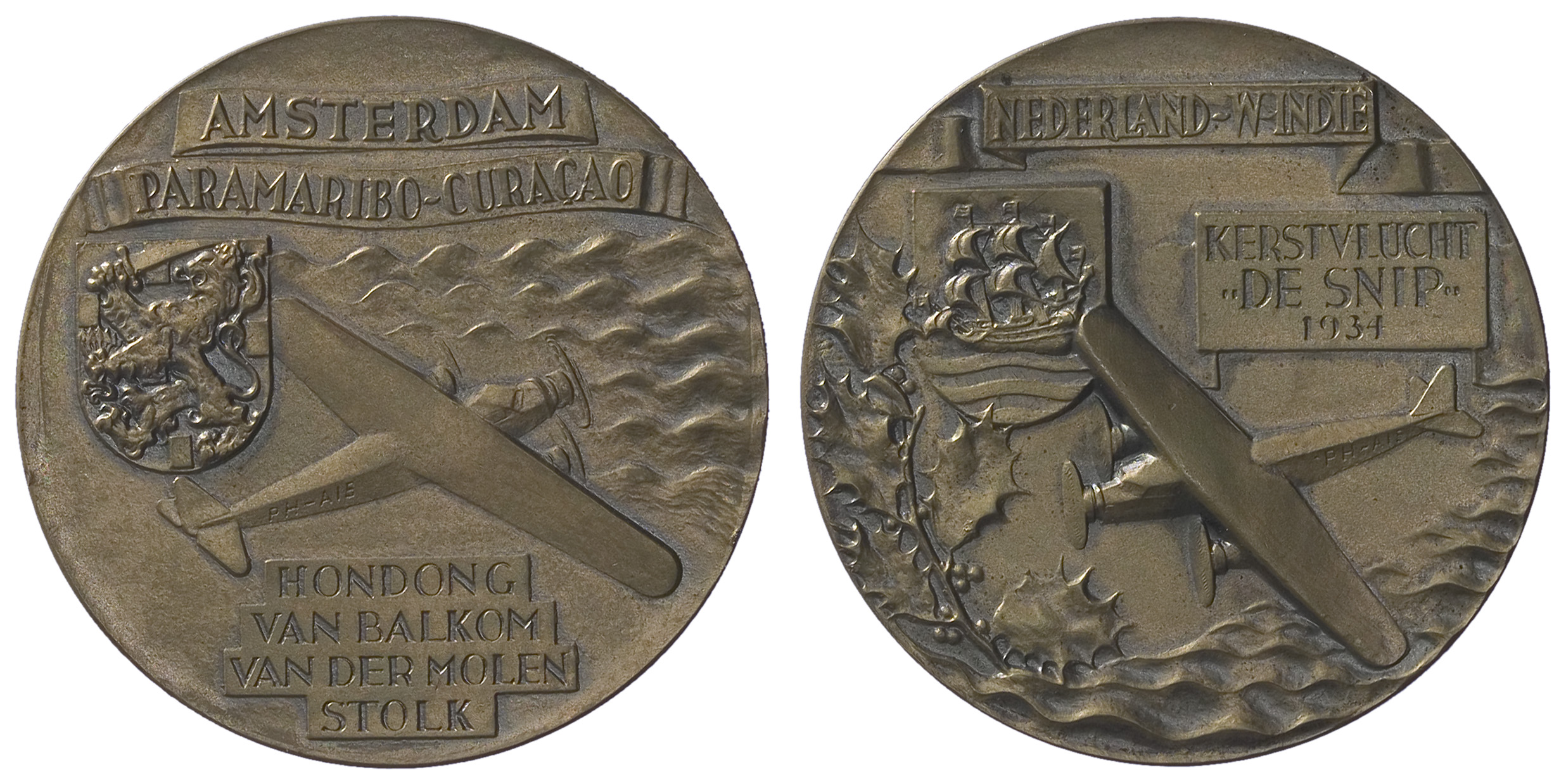
Commemorative coin

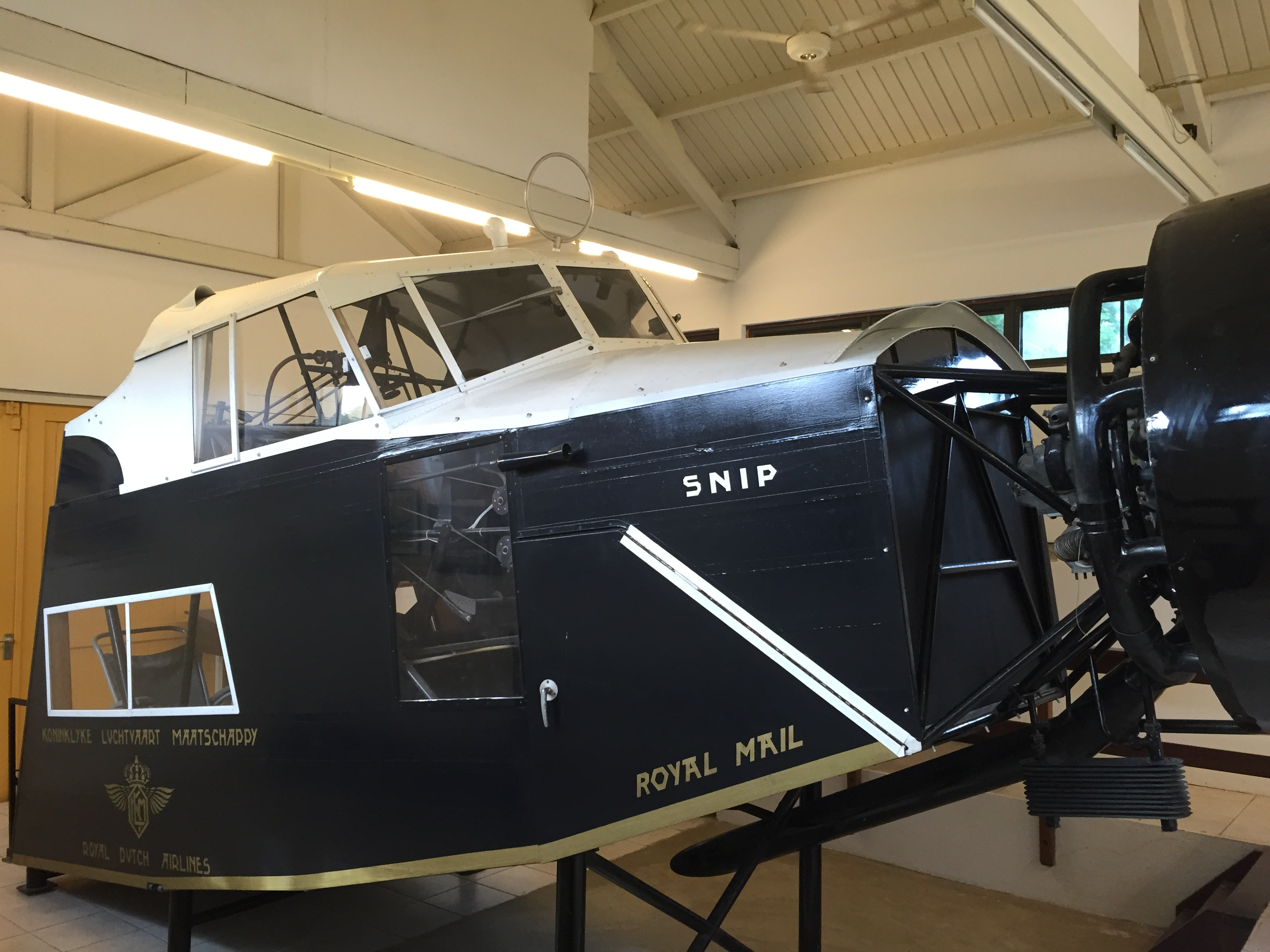
"Snip" in a museum (2014)

The Snip was a Fokker F.XVIII aircraft operated by KLM that became historically significant for performing the first transatlantic flight to Curaçao in December 1934.

== Flight to Curaçao ==
In December 1934, the Snip carried out a pioneering flight from Amsterdam to Curaçao, marking the first time an aircraft crossed the mid-Atlantic on this route. The journey began on 15 December 1934 and included stops such as Alicante, Casablanca, Porto Praia and Paramaribo. The aircraft arrived in Curaçao on 22 December 1934.

A key leg of the journey was the ocean crossing between Africa and South America, covering approximately 3,612 km without the possibility of landing. The aircraft was specially modified with additional fuel tanks, increasing its fuel capacity to about 4,900 liters, and equipped with radio communication systems to maintain contact during the flight.

The total journey took about eight days, with a total flight time of approximately 54 hours and 27 minutes. The successful arrival in Curaçao was considered a major milestone in aviation history and helped reduce the island’s isolation, demonstrating the potential of transatlantic air travel.

The aircraft was commanded by captain Jan Hondong, with a crew including a co-pilot, radio operator, and mechanic. Due to the need for extra fuel capacity, no passengers were carried during the transatlantic crossing, although mail was transported.

The flight of the Snip played an important role in the expansion of KLM's international network and marked the beginning of aviation connections between the Netherlands and the Caribbean. The event was later commemorated multiple times, including a 10-year anniversary in 1944 and a 25-year celebration in 1959.

== Retirement and restoration ==
The Snip was withdrawn from service in 1946. Parts of the aircraft, including the nose and cockpit, were preserved and later restored for display in a museum in Curaçao.

After its retirement, the aircraft fell into disrepair at Hato Airport, where parts of it were dismantled. The cockpit was eventually saved from destruction and preserved thanks to local efforts. Restoration initiatives, supported by KLM and individuals, led to the reconstruction of the cockpit in the Netherlands. It was presented to the public again in 1992 during an event titled The Return of De Snip.

Efforts were made to house the restored cockpit in a dedicated gallery at the Curaçaosch Museum. The project received support from various organizations and sponsors, highlighting the continued cultural and historical importance of Snip in Curaçao and aviation history.

In 1994, the historical significance of the aircraft was further recognized with the issuance of a commemorative 25-guilder coin marking the 60th anniversary of its landing in Curaçao.

== See also ==
- Transatlantic flight of Alcock and Brown
