= Garance Franke-Ruta =

American journalist

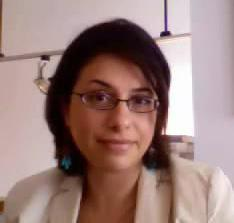
- Franke-Ruta in 2007
- Born: July 29, 1972 (age 54); Cavaillon, Vaucluse, France
- Education: Harvard University
- Occupations: Journalist; author
- Parent: Peter Ruta
- Relatives: Nelson Frank (grandfather); Vanessa Ruta (sister); Johanna Hurwitz (aunt); Ted Frank (cousin)

Garance Franke-Ruta has worked as executive editor of GEN by Medium, Washington editor of Yahoo News and editor in chief of Yahoo Politics, Voices columnist and politics editor of The Atlantic Online, national web politics editor for the Washington Post, senior editor at the American Prospect and senior writer at the Washington City Paper, D.C.'s alternative weekly newspaper. Her work has also appeared in Medium magazine, New York, The New York Times,The Wall Street Journal, The Atlantic, The New Republic, Slate, Salon, The Washington Monthly, Legal Affairs, Utne Reader and National Journal. After first attending Hunter College, she transferred to Harvard University, where she graduated magna cum laude in 1997.

== Early life ==
Franke-Ruta was born on July 29, 1972, in Cavaillon, France, while her parents were staying in Lacoste, Vaucluse, and grew up in San Cristóbal de las Casas in Chiapas, Mexico, Santa Fe, New Mexico, and New York City. Her first name is a French word referring to rose madder, a shade of red, and is the name of the main character in Les Enfants du Paradis. Franke-Ruta is the daughter of painter Peter Ruta, granddaughter of Nelson Frank, sister of 2019 MacArthur Fellow Vanessa Ruta, niece of Johanna Hurwitz, and cousin of Ted Frank.

She attended Santa Fe High School and a private high school in Santa Fe, New Mexico, each for one year, before obtaining a G.E.D. from the state of New Mexico in 1988.

She then moved to New York City and was a central part of activist group ACT UP, participating in many protests to fight AIDS, as seen in the documentary film How to Survive a Plague.

== Awards ==
- 2019 Vermont Studio Center residency
- 2019 pocoapoco residency, Oaxaca, Mexico
- 2018 Rockefeller Foundation Bellagio Center practitioner residency
- 2018 Downtown Las Vegas Plympton-Writer's Block residency
- 2016 Journalist Law School fellow, Loyola Law School
- 2013 The 140 Best Twitter Feeds of 2013, Time magazine
- 2007 Iowa Independent senior fellow in Des Moines, Iowa
- 2007 Hillman Prize for "Tapped", The American Prospect
- 2006 Shorenstein Center fellow, Harvard University's John F. Kennedy School of Government
- 2004 9/11 Security and Liberty fellow, USC Annenberg Institute for Justice and Journalism
