= Dorothy Kilgallen =

American journalist and TV personality

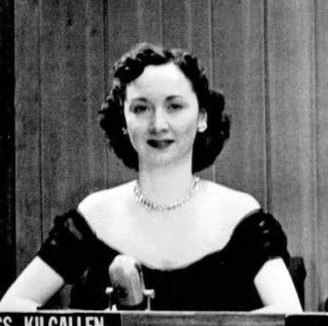
- Kilgallen on What's My Line? in 1952
- Born: Dorothy Mae Kilgallen; July 3, 1913; Chicago, Illinois, U.S.
- Died: November 8, 1965 (aged 52); New York City, New York, U.S.
- Resting place: Gate of Heaven Cemetery
- Education: Erasmus Hall High School
- Alma mater: The College of New Rochelle
- Occupations: Media personality, author, journalist, panelist
- Spouse: Richard Kollmar (m. 1940)
- Children: 3

Dorothy Mae Kilgallen (July 3, 1913 – November 8, 1965) was an American columnist, journalist, and television game show panelist. After spending two semesters at the College of New Rochelle, she started her career shortly before her 18th birthday as a reporter for the Hearst Corporation's New York Evening Journal. In 1938, she began her newspaper column "The Voice of Broadway", which was eventually syndicated to more than 140 papers. In 1950, she became a regular panelist on the television game show What's My Line?, continuing in the role until her death.

Kilgallen's columns featured mostly show-business news and gossip, but also ventured into other topics, such as politics and organized crime. She wrote front-page articles for multiple newspapers on the Sam Sheppard trial and, years later, events related to the John F. Kennedy assassination, such as testimony by Jack Ruby.

== Early life ==
Kilgallen was born in Chicago, Illinois, the daughter of newspaper reporter James Lawrence Kilgallen (1888–1982) and his wife, Mae Ahern (1888–1985). She was of Irish descent, and Catholic. She had one sister, Eleanor (1919–2014), who was six years younger. The family moved to various regions of the United States until 1920, when the International News Service hired James Kilgallen as a roving correspondent based in New York City.

The family settled in Brooklyn, New York. Dorothy Kilgallen was a student at Erasmus Hall High School. After completing two semesters at The College of New Rochelle, she dropped out to take a job as a reporter for the New York Evening Journal. The newspaper was owned and operated by the Hearst Corporation, which also owned International News Service, her father's employer.

== Career ==
In 1936, Kilgallen and two other New York newspaper reporters (Herbert Roslyn Ekins of the New York World-Telegram and Leo Kieran of The New York Times) competed in a race to travel around the world, using only means of transportation available to the general public. She was the only woman to compete in the contest and came in second. She described the race in her book Girl Around The World, which is credited as the story idea for the 1937 movie Fly-Away Baby starring Glenda Farrell as a character partly inspired by Kilgallen.

In November 1938, Kilgallen began writing a daily column, the "Voice of Broadway," for Hearst's New York Journal-American, after the corporation merged the Evening Journal with the American. The column, which she wrote until her death in 1965, featured mostly New York show business news and gossip, but also ventured into other topics such as politics and organized crime. The column eventually was syndicated to 146 newspapers via King Features Syndicate. Its success motivated Kilgallen to move her parents and Eleanor from Brooklyn to Manhattan, where she continued to live with them until she got married.

On April 6, 1940, Kilgallen married Richard Kollmar, a musical comedy actor and singer who had starred in the Broadway show Knickerbocker Holiday and was performing in the Broadway cast of Too Many Girls at the time of their wedding. They had three children: Richard "Dickie" (b. 1941), Jill (b. 1943), and Kerry Kollmar (b. 1954), and remained married until Kilgallen's death.

Early in their marriage, Kilgallen and Kollmar both launched careers in network radio. During World War II, Kilgallen's program Voice of Broadway was aired. It was initially broadcast on CBS from 1941 to 1942, and was picked up by Mutual Radio in 1944 for a brief run. Kollmar starred as the titular character in the nationally syndicated crime drama Boston Blackie. His weekly performances in the series, broadcast live, began in April 1945, when he replaced radio actor Chester Morris, and continued until June 1949.

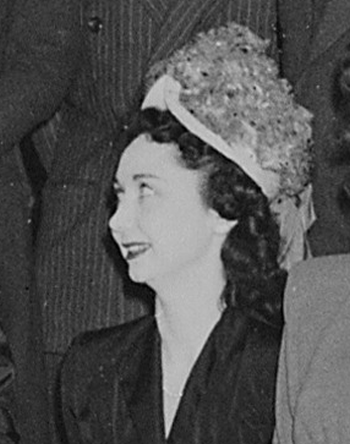
Kilgallen in the White House, 1946

Beginning in April 1945, Kilgallen and Kollmar co-hosted a weekday radio talk show on WOR 710 AM. Breakfast With Dorothy and Dick was broadcast live from their 16-room apartment at 640 Park Avenue. The show followed them when they bought a neo-Georgian townhouse at 45 East 68th Street in 1952. The radio program, like Kilgallen's newspaper column, mixed entertainment news and gossip with serious matters. Kilgallen and Kollmar occasionally had a major league baseball player as a guest on the show.

The couple continued doing the show from their home, with most broadcasts airing live, until 1963. Kilgallen's longtime fellow panelist on What's My Line, Arlene Francis, also hosted a weekday talk show on WOR for many years, starting in 1960.

Magazine inserts in Sunday editions of newspapers carried Kilgallen's articles over a period of decades. So did at least two magazines owned by the Hearst corporation: Good Housekeeping and Cosmopolitan. The Billy Rose Theatre Division of the New York Public Library for the Performing Arts has, in its Kilgallen collection, a 1964 piece she wrote about newlyweds Elizabeth Taylor and Richard Burton in the German-language weekly Quick, published by the Bauer Media Group in Munich.

As part of Kilgallen’s Hearst corporation job duty of interviewing young singers who were starting careers at New York’s trendy nightclubs, she befriended singer Johnnie Ray in 1952 during his rise to international fame. Their close relationship lasted until her death.

=== Frank Sinatra feud ===
Kilgallen and singer Frank Sinatra were fairly good friends for several years and were photographed rehearsing in a radio studio for a 1948 broadcast. Eventually, they had a falling out after she wrote a multi-part 1956 front-page feature article titled "The Real Frank Sinatra Story". In addition to the New York Journal-American, Hearst-owned newspapers across the United States ran the feature.

Following this publication, Sinatra made derogatory comments about Kilgallen's physical appearance to his nightclub audiences in New York and Las Vegas. However, he stopped short of mentioning her name on television or during magazine and newspaper interviews.

=== Sam Sheppard murder trial ===
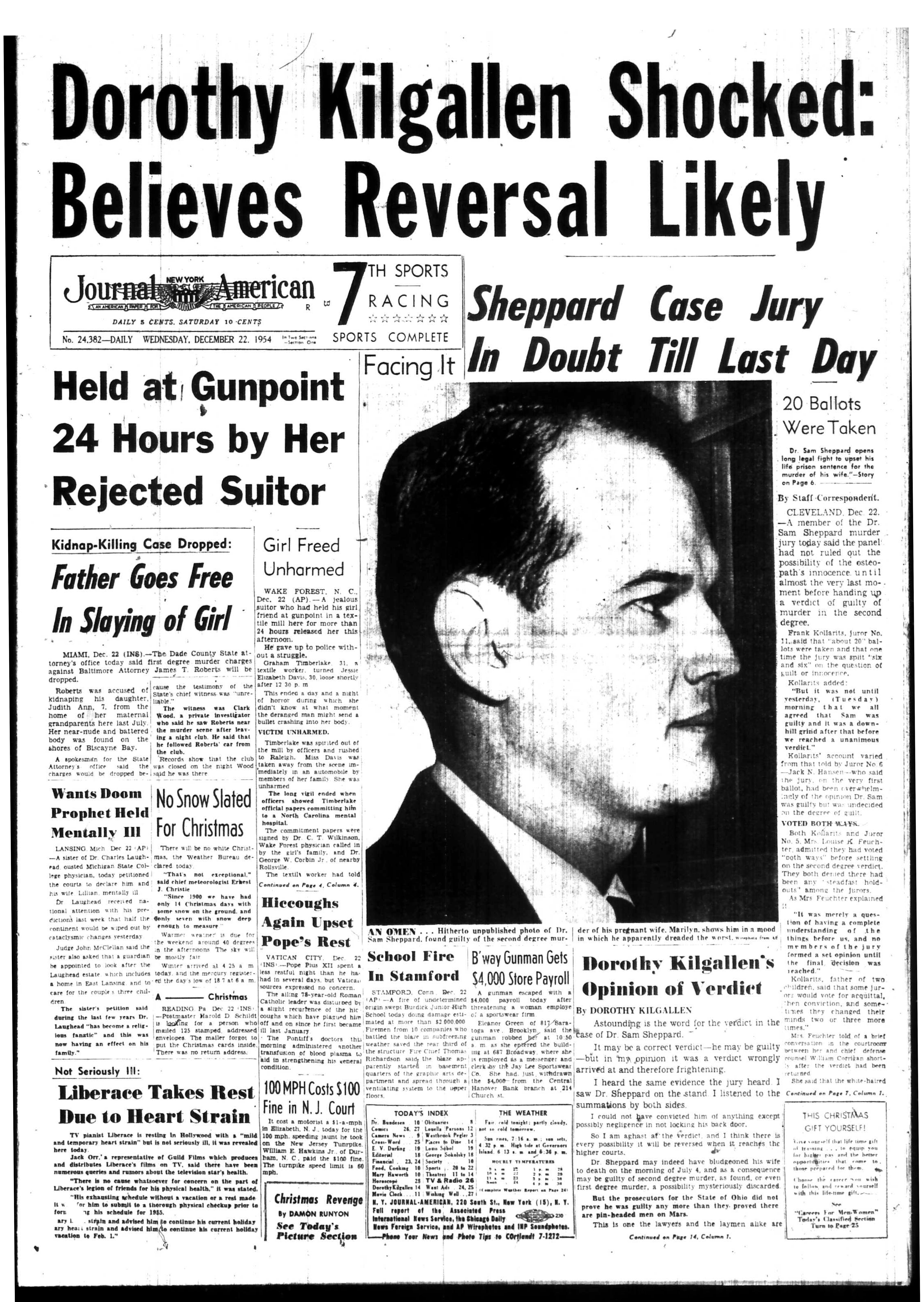
New York Journal-American front page December 22, 1954

Kilgallen covered the 1954 murder trial of Sam Sheppard. Sheppard was a doctor convicted of killing his wife at their home in the Cleveland suburb of Bay Village.

The New York Journal-American carried the banner front-page headline that Kilgallen was "shocked" by the guilty verdict because of what she argued were serious flaws in the prosecution's case. At the time of the Cleveland jury's guilty verdict in December 1954, Kilgallen's sharp criticism of it was controversial and a Cleveland newspaper dropped her column in response. Her articles and columns in 1954 did not reveal all she had witnessed in the Cuyahoga County Court of Common Pleas.

Nine years after the verdict and sentence, and after the judge had died, she claimed at an event held at the Overseas Press Club in New York that the judge had told her before the start of jury selection that Sheppard was "guilty as hell".

Attorney F. Lee Bailey, who was working on a habeas corpus petition for his client Sheppard, attended the Overseas Press Club event, heard what Kilgallen told the crowd, and then asked her privately if she would help him. "Some days later," as Bailey wrote in his memoir The Defense Never Rests, "we obtained a deposition from Dorothy that was inserted into the petition submitted to" Carl Andrew Weinman, judge for the United States District Court for the Southern District of Ohio.

Bailey also included in the habeas corpus petition a statement from Edward Murray, who had worked in 1954 as a court clerk at the Cuyahoga County Court of Common Pleas. Similar to Kilgallen's statement, Murray's statement indicated that Edward J. Blythin, the original Sheppard judge, had said that Sheppard was guilty even before the grand jury indicted him on August 17, 1954.

In July 1964, four months after the Overseas Press Club event where Kilgallen broke her silence about the deceased Judge Blythin, Judge Weinman of the federal court granted Bailey's habeas corpus petition, Sam Sheppard was released from prison amid much newspaper publicity, and Sheppard met Kilgallen at a "late-night champagne party" (as described by Bailey in The Defense Never Rests) in Cleveland. After Kilgallen's death, Sheppard was retried and acquitted.

=== John F. Kennedy assassination ===
Kilgallen was publicly skeptical of the conclusions of the Warren Commission's report about the assassination of President Kennedy and Jack Ruby's shooting of Lee Harvey Oswald, and she wrote several newspaper articles on the subject. On February 23, 1964, she published an article in the New York Journal-American about a conversation she had with Jack Ruby, when he was at his defense table during a recess in his murder trial.

She also obtained a copy of Ruby's testimony to the Warren Commission, which he had given on June 7, 1964. Kilgallen published it in August 1964 in three installments on the front pages of the New York Journal-American, The Philadelphia Inquirer, the Seattle Post-Intelligencer, and other newspapers. In response, the Warren Commission condemned what it called the "premature publication" of Ruby's testimony and announced that there would be a federal investigation as to how Kilgallen had received the testimony.

=== What's My Line? ===
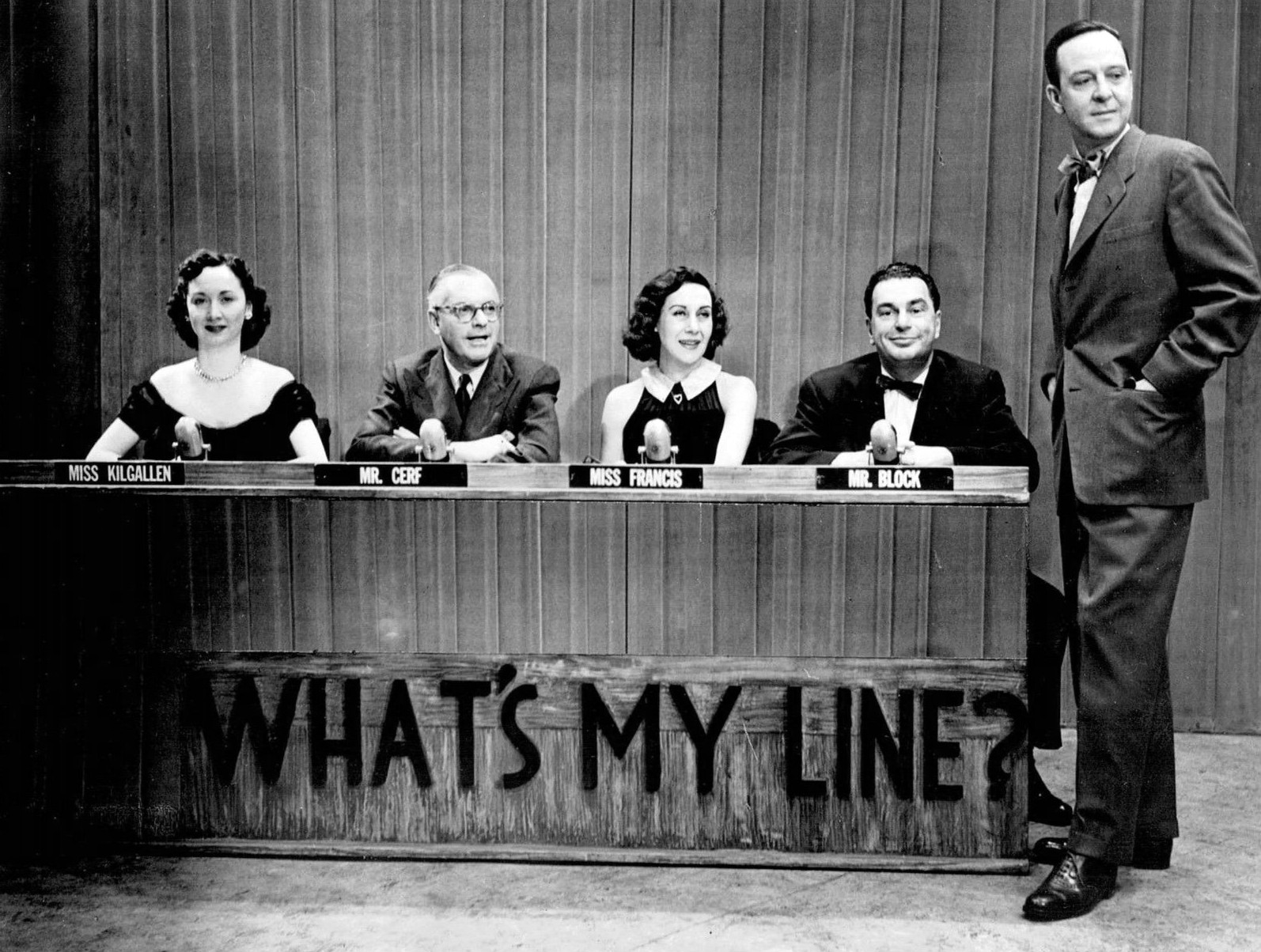
The What's My Line? panel in 1952: Kilgallen, Bennett Cerf, Arlene Francis, and Hal Block, with John Daly as the host

Kilgallen became a panelist on the American television game show What's My Line?, beginning on its first broadcast, which aired live on February 2, 1950. The series was telecast from New York City on the CBS television network until 1967. She was seen almost every Sunday evening on the show for 15 years, until her death.

Beginning in 1959, the series was not always telecast live. Goodson Todman Productions recorded the show on videotape, a recent invention. In 1961, producers were able to stockpile enough videotaped episodes so that Kilgallen and fellow panelists Arlene Francis and Bennett Cerf, along with host John Charles Daly, could take their summer vacations. In 1965, they returned to do a live telecast on September 12. It was followed by eight consecutive Sunday nights when Kilgallen appeared live, the last of them being November 7.

== Death ==
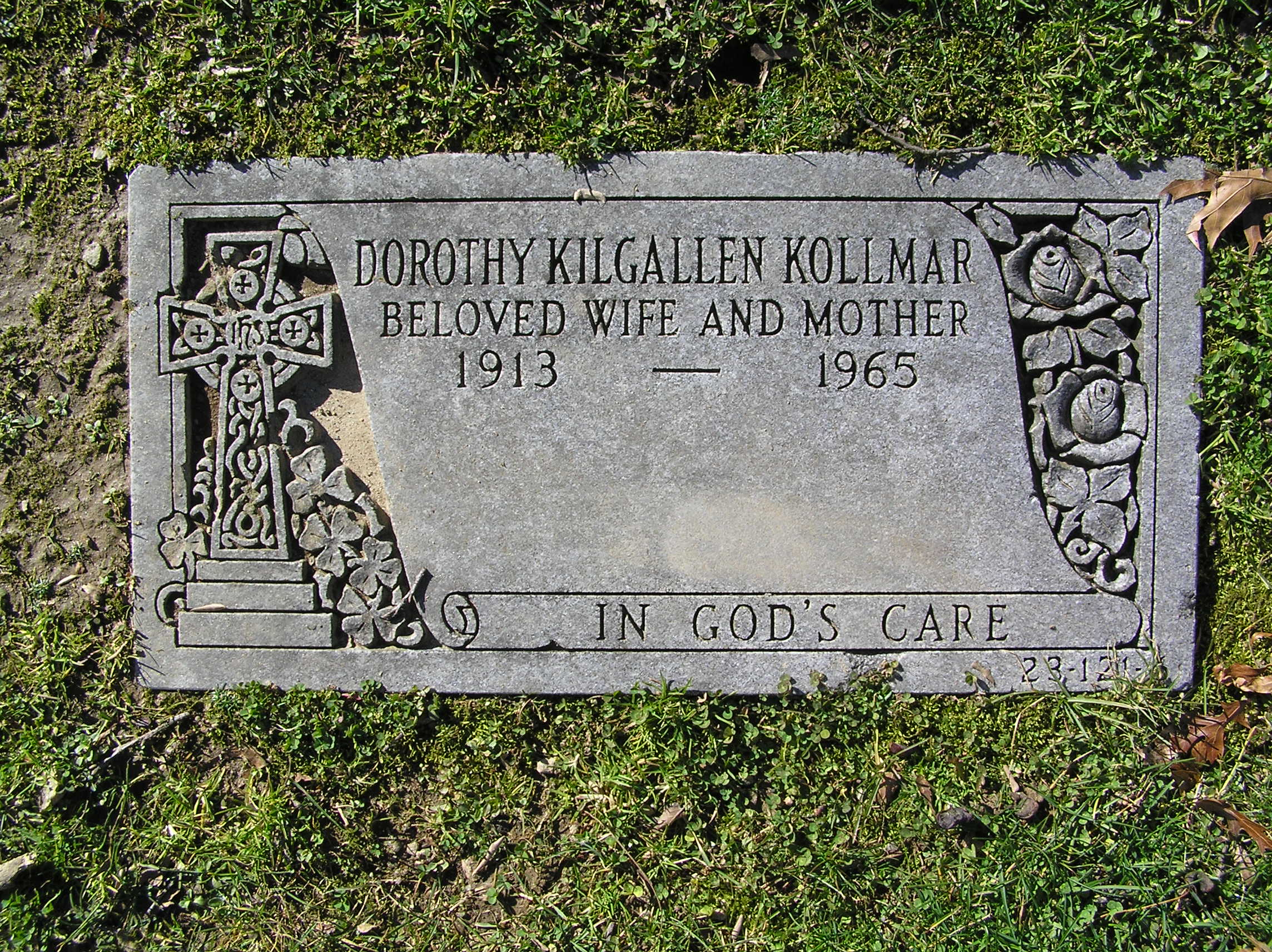
The footstone of Dorothy Kilgallen in Gate of Heaven Cemetery

On November 8, 1965, Kilgallen was found dead in her Manhattan townhouse located at 45 East 68th Street. Her death was determined to have been caused by a combination of alcohol and barbiturates. The police said there was no indication of violence or suicide. New York City medical examiner James Luke said the circumstances of her death were undetermined, but emphasized the overdose could have been accidental. "It could have simply been an extra pill," said Luke. "We really don't know."

Her funeral took place on November 11 at the Church of St. Vincent Ferrer in Manhattan; John Daly, Arlene Francis, What's My Line? producer Mark Goodson, Betty White, Ed Sullivan, Joseph E. Levine, and Bob Considine were among the 2,600 people attending. Coverage of the funeral in the New York Journal-American, where she had worked, included "Mrs. Bennett Cerf" (Phyllis Fraser), among the notable people who attended. She was interred at the Gate of Heaven Cemetery in Hawthorne, Westchester County, New York.

=== Legacy ===
In 1960, Kilgallen was one of the initial 500 people chosen to receive a star on the Hollywood Walk of Fame. The What's My Line? telecast on November 14, 1965, paid tribute to Kilgallen. Kitty Carlisle filled in for Kilgallen during the episode, and said on camera that although she was occupying Kilgallen's seat, "no one could ever possibly take her place".

In a 1996 memoir, Kilgallen's colleague and friend Theo Wilson wrote that her work as a crime reporter was often overlooked during her lifetime and was forgotten after her death:

"Part of being a good reporter is to be anonymous, to stay out of the story so that you can better watch and study and listen to the principals. She couldn't do that, mostly because people wouldn't let her. She'd walk into a trial and the prosecutor would ask for her autograph for his wife or the judge would send out greetings."

In 2025, the New York City government dedicated the corner of East 68th Street and Park Avenue as "Dorothy Kilgallen Way".

== Filmography ==
- Sinner Take All (1936) onscreen appearance as a fictitious reporter
- Fly-Away Baby (1937) identified in the opening credits as the inspiration for the story; her book Girl Around the World, published in 1936, was the source.
- Pajama Party (1964) uncredited onscreen cameo appearance as herself

== Written works ==
- Dorothy Kilgallen and Herb Shapiro, Girl Around the World (David McKay Publishing, 1936)
- Dorothy Kilgallen, Murder One (Random House, 1967) ASIN: B0007EFTJ6

== In popular culture ==
"Flo Kilgore", a character based on Kilgallen, appears in novels by Max Allan Collins in his series featuring private detective Nathan Heller. In Ask Not (2013), Heller and Kilgore investigate the JFK assassination.

== See also ==
- Gossip columnist
