= Medang Island =

Island in Sumbawa Regency, West Nusa Tenggara Province, Indonesia

Medang Island (Indonesian: Pulau Medang) is an island group off the north coast of Sumbawa, west of Moyo Island, in the Flores Sea. It is actually composed of two islands, Medang Besar and Medang Kecil (big and small), administratively called Bajo Medang and Bugis Medang; together they cover an area of about 28 km^{2} and had a combined population of about 3,000 in 2022. There are coral reefs in this area, with sharks and giant sponges.

== See also ==
- List of islands of Indonesia
