= Vanessa Ruta =

American neuroscientist

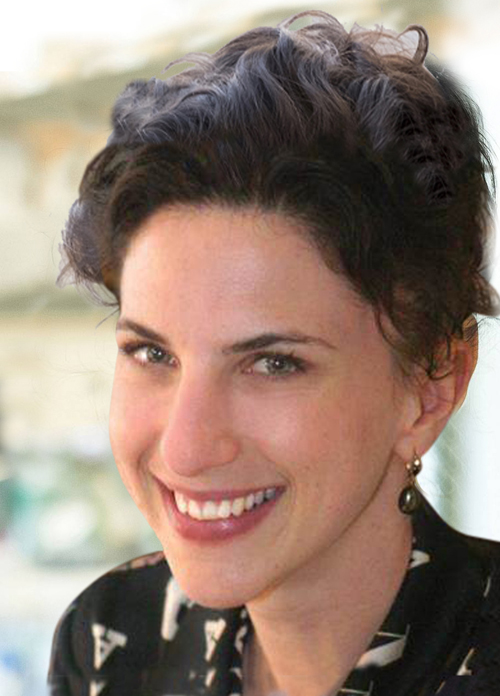
- Ruta in 2015
- Born: Chiapas, Mexico
- Citizenship: United States
- Education: Hunter College; Rockefeller University; Columbia University
- Spouse: Rickie Mohan
- Awards: Harold M. Weintraub Graduate Student Award (2005); National Institutes of Health Director’s New Innovator Award (2013); MacArthur Foundation Fellow (2019)
- Scientific career
- Fields: Neuroscience
- Workplaces: Rockefeller University
- Doctoral advisor: Roderick MacKinnon
- Other academic advisors: Richard Axel, Robert Barlow Jr.
- Website: www.rockefeller.edu/our-scientists/heads-of-laboratories/989-vanessa-ruta/

Vanessa Julia Ruta is an American neuroscientist known for her work on the structure and function of chemosensory circuits underlying innate and learned behaviors in the fly Drosophila melanogaster. She is the Gabrielle H. Reem and Herbert J. Kayden Professor and Head of the Laboratory of Neurophysiology and Behavior at The Rockefeller University and, as of 2021, an Investigator of the Howard Hughes Medical Institute.

Ruta is a 2019 MacArthur Fellow. She was one of the six fellows from New York City.

== Education and scientific career ==
Ruta graduated summa cum laude from Hunter College in Chemistry in 2000. She went on to perform doctoral research in the laboratory of Rod Mackinnon, earning her Ph.D. in Biology from The Rockefeller University in 2005. In Mackinnon's lab, she played a critical role in solving the structure of the voltage-dependent potassium ion channel. During her graduate work, she investigated the structural biology and function of potassium channels. These deeply conserved proteins conduct ions across biological membranes and are targets of toxin including those produced by the tarantula. Vanessa worked out the mechanism by which spider toxins bind the voltage sensor domain of potassium channels. As a postdoctoral fellow with Richard Axel at Columbia University, Ruta switched fields to the analysis of how the brain encodes both innate and learned stimuli and discovered a sexually dimorphic circuit that drives male fly responses to a pheromone, and traced the activity of the circuit from the periphery to the motor output. She joined the faculty at The Rockefeller University in 2011.

== Career ==
In work that bridged her postdoc and the establishment of her own independent group her at Rockefeller University, Ruta demonstrated that the mushroom body encodes information using a rewriteable random access memory architecture. Her lab has elucidated brain circuits that control male fly responses to female pheromones, demonstrated that the memory center of the fly brain uses compartmentalized dopamine modulation to encode behaviors, described the evolution of central neural circuits underlying courtship decisions in Drosophila and solved the structure of the invertebrate olfactory receptor co-receptor (Orco).

Her work on the structure of insect odorant receptors—a potential target for new insect repellents—has been funded by the Bill & Melinda Gates Foundation.

Ruta is a member of the selection committee of the Perl-UNC Neuroscience Prize

== Awards and honors ==
For her PhD work, Ruta received the Harold M. Weintraub Graduate Student Award in 2005. She has received a number of junior faculty awards, including the New York Stem Cell Foundation–Robertson Neuroscience Investigator Award (2012), the McKnight Neuroscience Scholar Award (2012), the Pew Biomedical Scholar Award (2012), the Sinsheimer Fund Scholar Award (2012), the Irma T. Hirschl/Monique Weill-Caulier Trust Research Award (2013), and the Alfred P. Sloan Research Fellowship in Neuroscience (2013). In 2013, Ruta received the National Institutes of Health Director’s New Innovator Award, for a project that aims to connect neural plasticity to learning and memory. She was named a MacArthur Foundation Fellow in 2019. Elected to the National Academy of Sciences in 2026.

== Personal life ==
Ruta is the daughter of landscape painter Peter Ruta. She spent her early childhood in New York City and Santa Fe, New Mexico. Ruta returned to New York City to live in the Westbeth Artists Community in Greenwich Village, and she attended Stuyvesant High School. Between high school and college, Ruta was a professional ballet dancer. She is the sister of journalist Garance Franke-Ruta. Ruta married graphic designer Rickie Mohan in 2001.
