= Fokker F.XVIII =

1930s Dutch airliner

F.XVIII
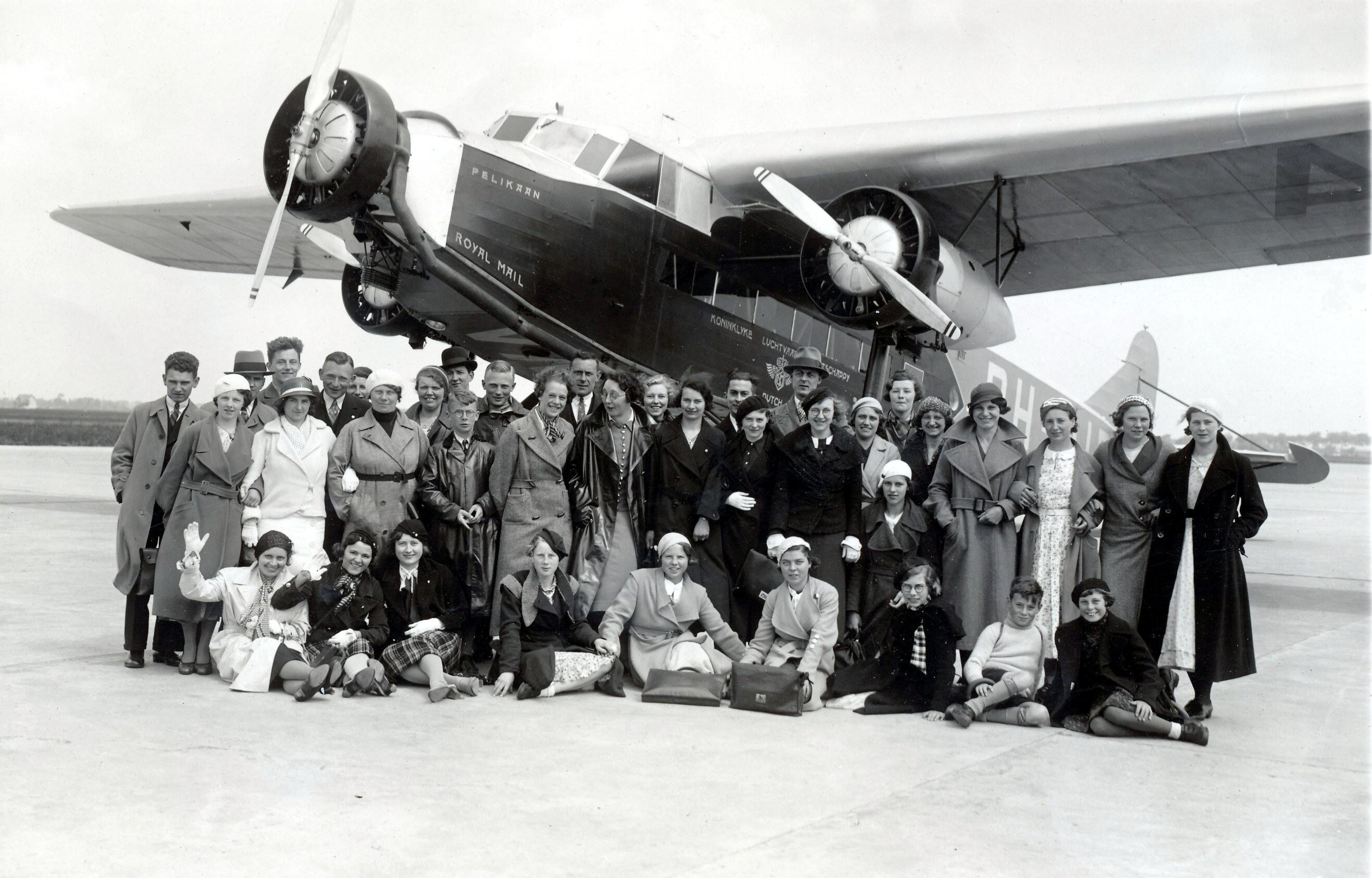

General information
- Type: Airliner
- Manufacturer: Fokker
- Primary user: KLM
- Number built: 5

History
- First flight: 30 June 1932

The Fokker F.XVIII was an airliner produced in the Netherlands in the early 1930s, essentially a scaled-up version of the Fokker F.XII intended for long-distance flights. Like its predecessor, it was a conventional high-wing cantilever monoplane with fixed tailwheel undercarriage. Its cabin could seat 12 passengers, or four-to-six on seats convertible to sleeping berths. Only five were built, all for KLM, and registered as PH-AIO, PH-AIP, PH-AIQ, PH-AIR and PH-AIS, all of which were named after birds. Used by KLM on its Amsterdam-Batavia route, the F.XVIII became celebrated in the Netherlands due to two especially noteworthy flights. In December 1933, one aircraft (registration PH-AIP, Pelikaan - "Pelican") was used to make a special Christmas mail flight to Batavia, completing the round trip in a flight time of 73 hours 34 minutes. The following Christmas, another F.XVIII (registration PH-AIS, Snip - "Snipe") made a similar flight to Curaçao in 55 hours 58 minutes after having been specially re-engined for the journey.

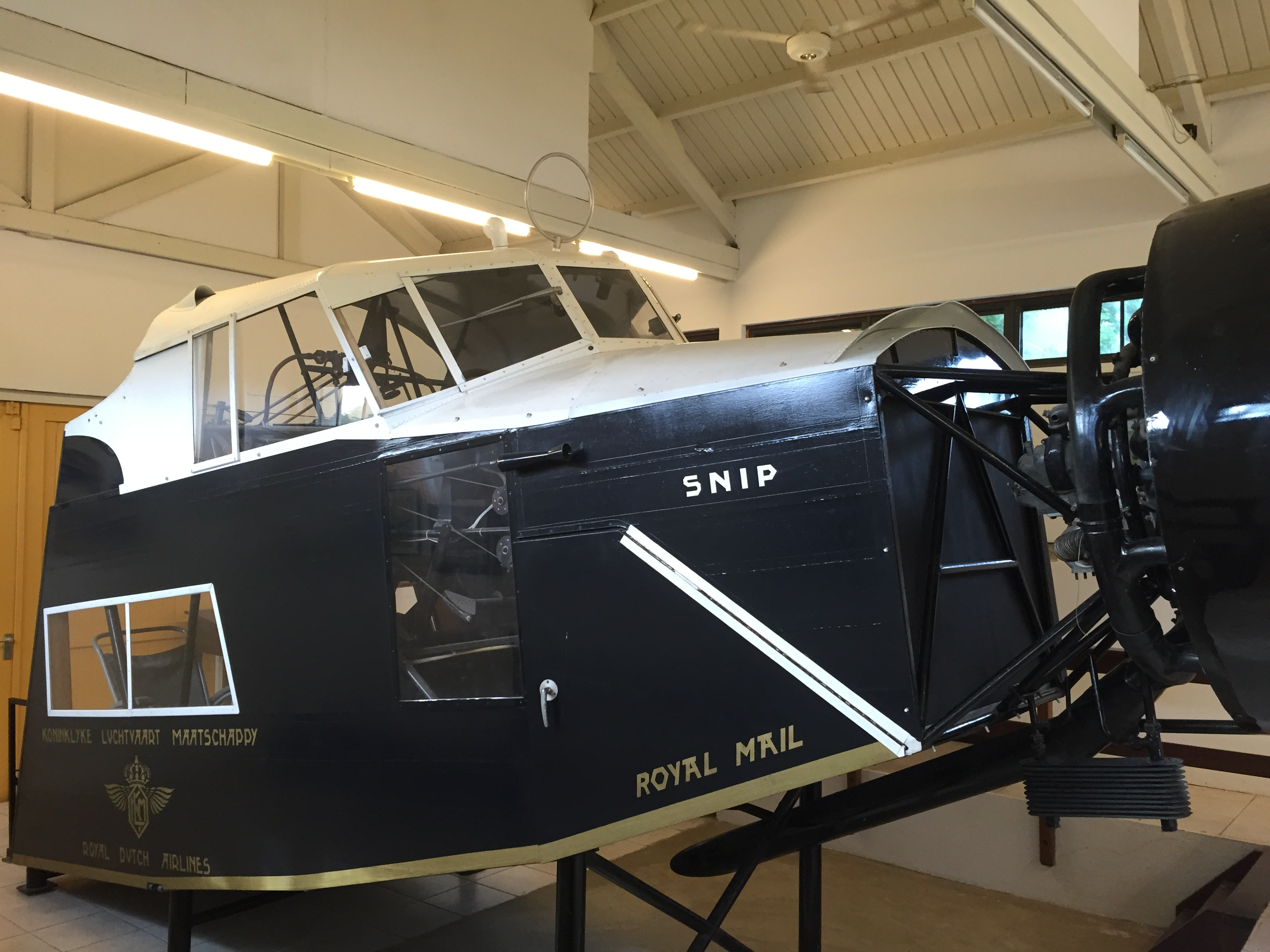
Snip in the Curacao Museum in Willemstad

In October 1936, the F.XVIIIs were withdrawn from the service to Batavia, replaced by the Douglas DC-2. KLM sold PH-AIQ and PH-AIR to Československá Letecká Společnost where they were re-registered as OK-AIQ and OK-AIR. They used them on their Prague-Vienna-Berlin route until 1938. OK-AIQ then went to Commercial Aviation Corporation at Lydda, Palestine (now Ben Gurion Airport) in December 1938 where it became VQ-PAF, crashing there on 13 January 1939. The wreck remained on the airfield until 1948 when it was taken on charge by the Israeli Air Force but never re-built and it was subsequently scrapped in Israel. OK-AIR was taken on-charge by Deutsche Lufthansa in 1938 as D-AAIR. Its fate is unrecorded - probably pressed into Luftwaffe service and destroyed during WW2. PH-AIP Pelikaan went to Air Tropique, a front for the Spanish Republican government which used it as a transport during the Spanish Civil War. It was transferred onto the French register as F-APIP and was subsequently destroyed by a bombing raid at Vilajuiga, Spain on 6 February 1939. The two remaining aircraft were transferred to KLMWIB (Koninklijke Luchtvaart Maatschappij West-Indisch Bedrijf - KLM's West Indies Division) at Willemstad, Curaçao for regional services in the Caribbean. One of these was PH-AIS Snip, later PJ-AIS, the other was PH-AIO, later PJ-AIO, originally named Oehoe ("Owl"), but renamed Oriol ("Oriole") since the Owl was regarded as unlucky in the local culture. These aircraft served on routes between Curaçao and Venezuela, Dutch Guiana (now Suriname), Columbia and Trinidad as well as inter-island services to Aruba, Bonaire and Saint Maarten. Routes to Jamaica opened in 1941, and Cuba and Miami in 1942.

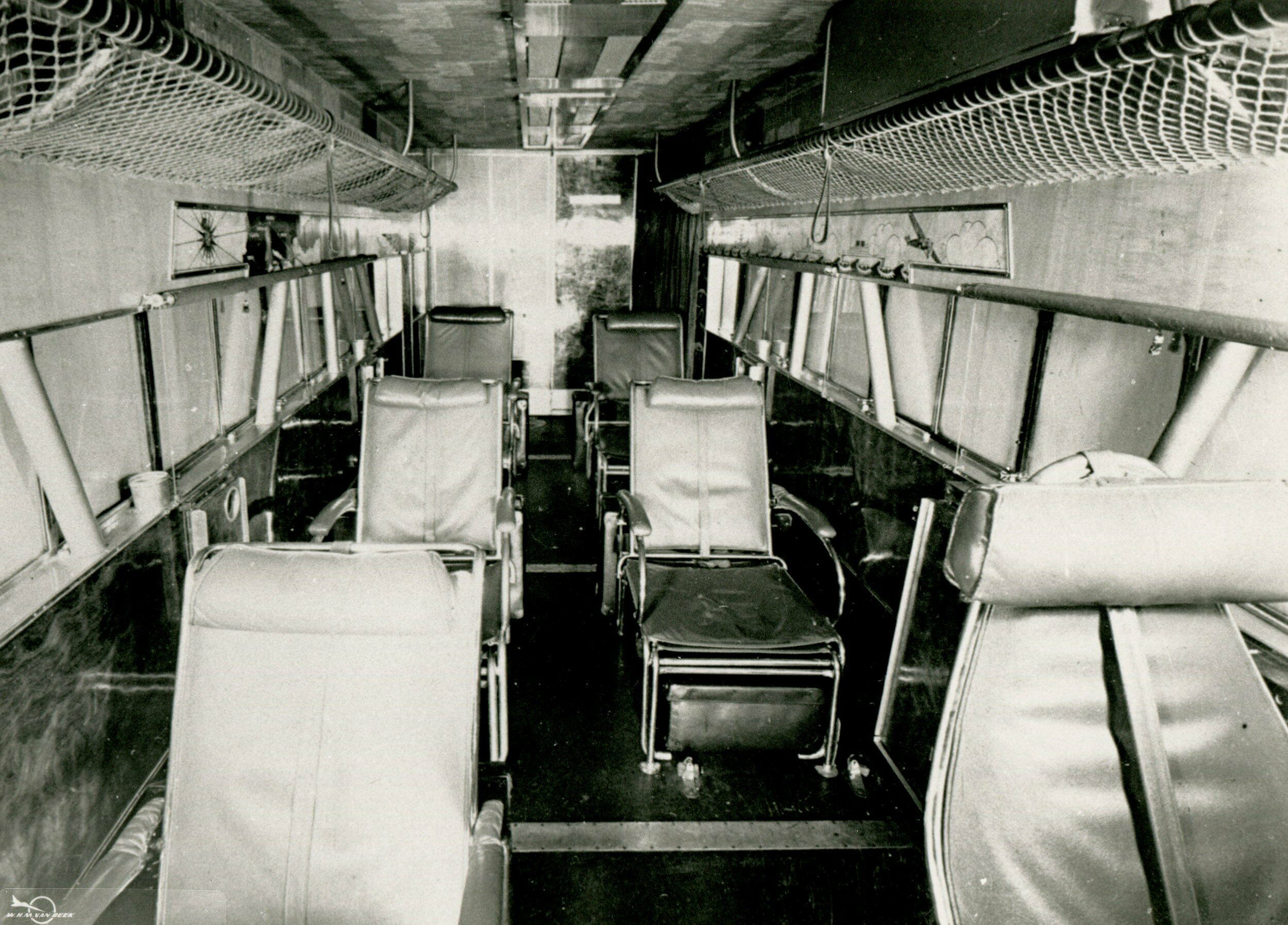
Aircraft interior cabin

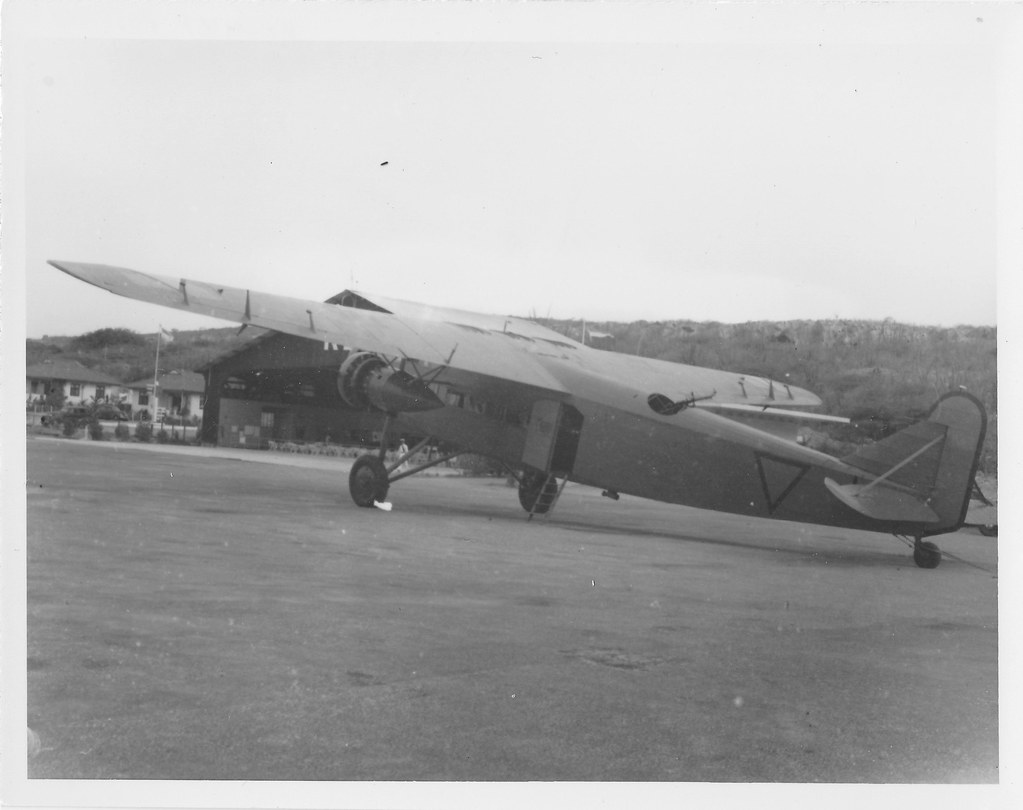
Fokker F.XVIII PJ-AIO photographed while serving with the Netherlands West Indies Defence Force, about 1941

PJ-AIO was leased to the Netherlands West Indies colonial government in June 1940 and converted by KLM engineers into a maritime patrol aircraft for use by the Netherlands West Indies Defence Force. A single .303 Lewis machine gun was fitted on a flexible mount firing from an open dorsal position. The passenger cabin was stripped out and a bomb-bay installed consisting of racks to hold an unspecified number of improvised 8 kg (80mm) anti-submarine bombs aimed and dropped by hand from an open bombardier's hatch in the bomb bay floor. The aircraft was given a coat of camouflage paint and orange Dutch national markings were applied. No military serial was allocated. The machine was employed on anti-submarine patrol duties from both Oranjestad, Aruba and Hato, Curaçao from 1940 until 1942 when it was returned to KLM civil use, the anti-submarine patrols being taken over by US aircraft.

PJ-AIO and PJ-AIS remained in service with KLMWIB until 1946 when PJ-AIO was broken-up at Curaçao. PJ-AIS remained derelict at Willemstad until restored as a museum-piece in the 1970s. The forward fuselage section of Snip is now preserved at the Curaçao Museum.

== Operators ==
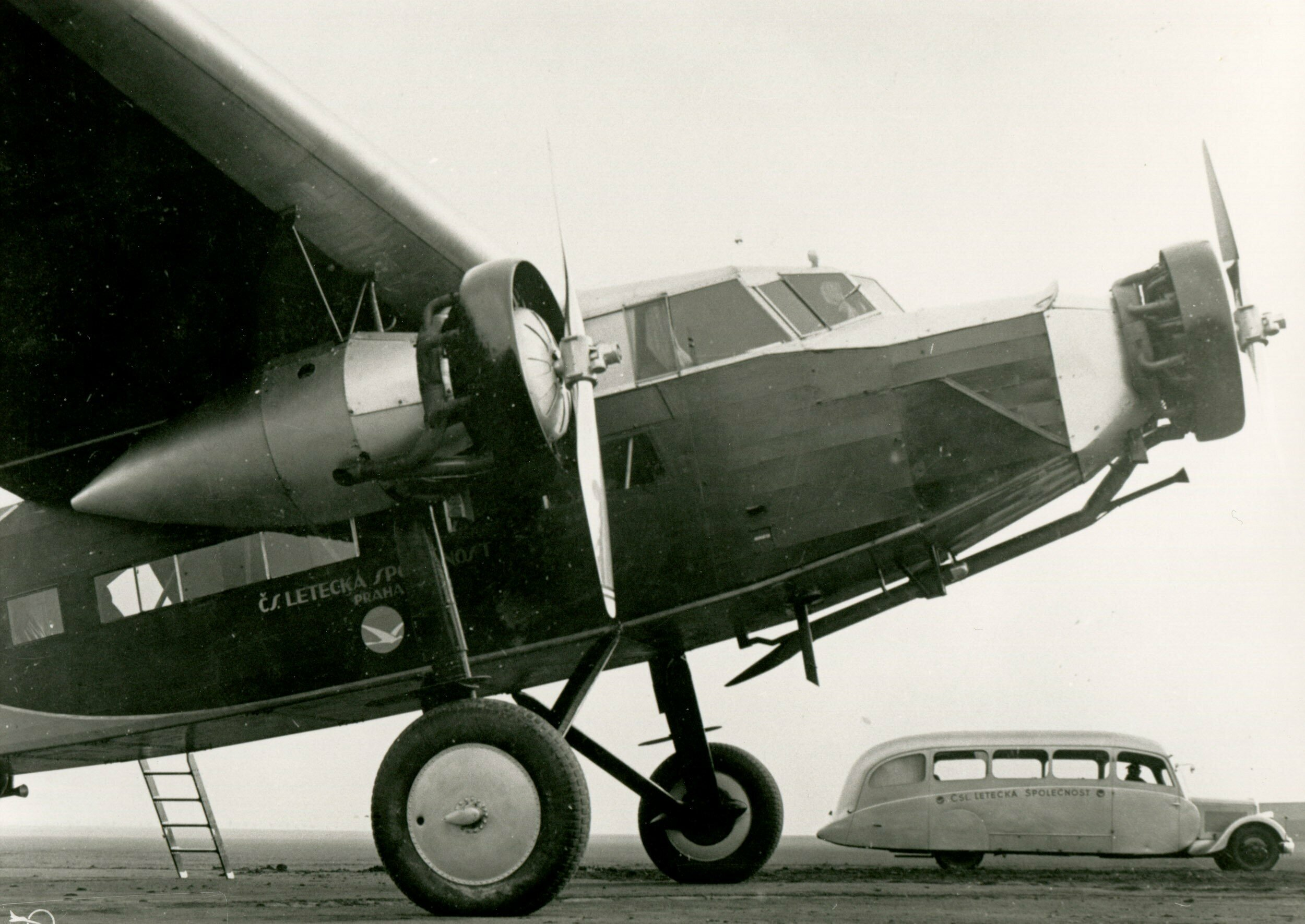
An F.XVIII operated by Czechoslovak airline ČLS (Československá letecká společnost)

- KLM (5 aircraft. PH-AIO, PH-AIP, PH-AIQ, PH-AIR, and PH-AIS)
- Československá letecká společnost (2 aircraft ex-KLM, OK-AIQ and OK-AIR)
- Commercial Aviation Co. Ltd., Lydda, (now Lod) Palestine (1 aircraft ex-ČLS, VQ-PAF)
- Israeli Air Force, (1 aircraft, ex-Commercial Aviation Co. VQ-PAF)
- Deutsche Lufthansa (1 aircraft ex-ČSA, D-AAIR)
- Air Tropique F-APIP (ex PH-AIP Pelikaan)
- Spanish Republican Air Force FARE (ex F-APIP only military code BF)
- KLM West-Indisch Bedrijf (KLM West Indies Division) (2 aircraft ex-KLM, PJ-AIO and PJ-AIS)
- Netherlands West Indies Defence Force (1 aircraft leased from KLM, PJ-AIO)

== Specifications (Snip) ==
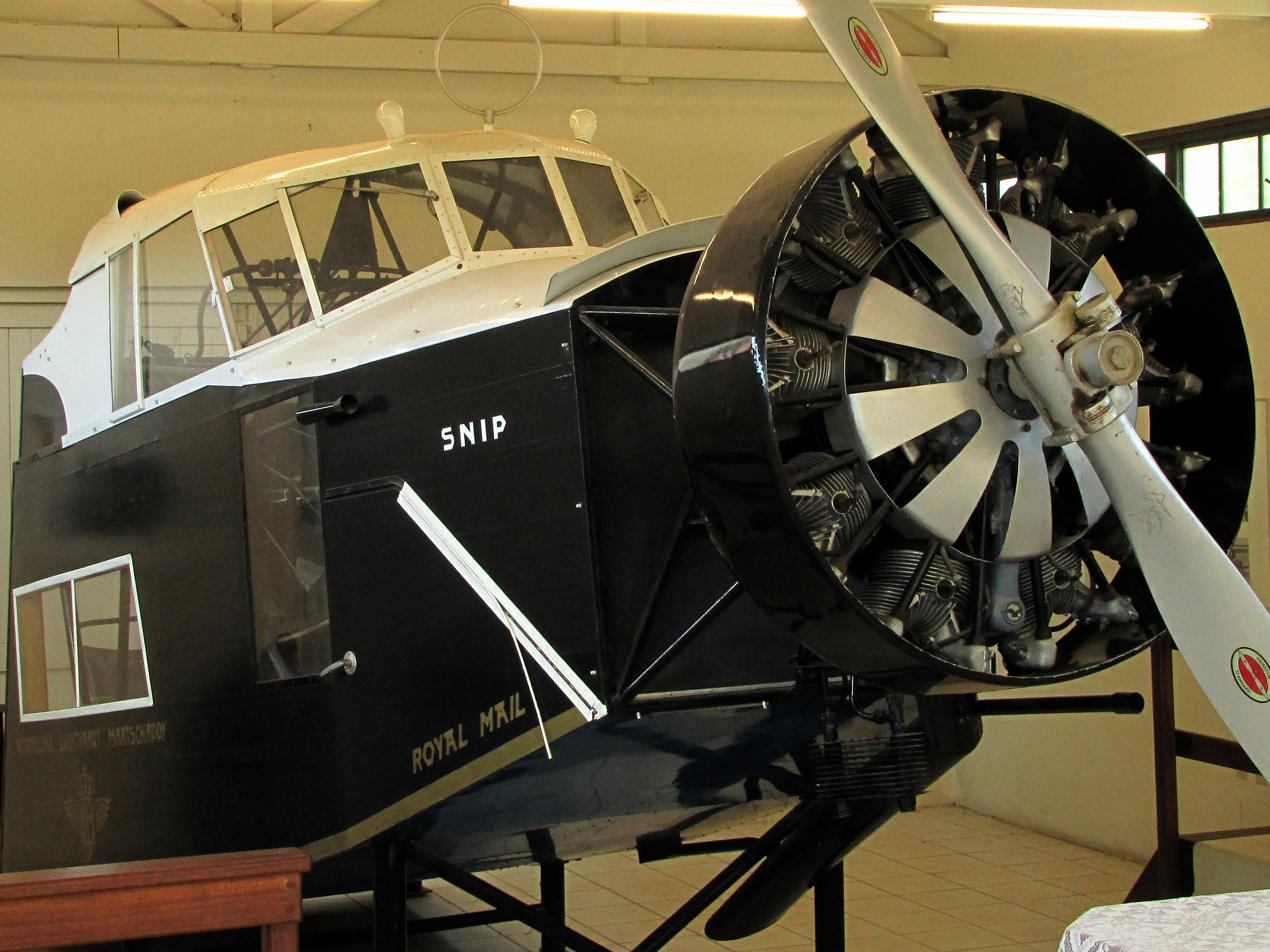
Remains of KLM Fokker F.XVIII Snip as exhibited in the Curaçao Museum.

General characteristics

- Crew: Two-four
- Capacity: 12 passengers
- Length: 18.50 m (60 ft 8 in)
- Wingspan: 24.50 m (80 ft 4 in)
- Wing area: 84.0 m^{2} (904 sq ft)
- Empty weight: 4,620 kg (10,190 lb)
- Gross weight: 7,850 kg (17,300 lb)
- Powerplant: 3 × Pratt & Whitney Wasp C , 313 kW (420 hp) each

Performance

- Maximum speed: 240 km/h (150 mph, 130 kn)
- Range: 1,820 km (1,130 mi, 980 nmi)
- Service ceiling: 4,800 m (15,750 ft)

Armament

- (military conversion) one .303 Lewis machine gun on flexible dorsal mount
- (military conversion) unspecified number of 8 kg. anti-submarine bombs

== Bibliography ==
- Hazewinkel, Harm J. (May 1977). "Amsterdam-Batavia en 4 jours, mais c'était en 1933... Fokker F.XVIII" [Amsterdam-Batavia in 4 Days, but in 1933... Fokker F.XVIII]. Le Fana de l'Aviation (in French) (90): 16–21. ISSN 0757-4169.
- Howson, Gerald (August–November 1990). "Fokker's Trimotors Go to War". Air Enthusiast (13): 43–49. ISSN 0143-5450.
