= New York World-Telegram =

New York City newspaper (1931–1966)

New York World-Telegram/ New York World-Telegram and The Sun (from 1950)
- Front page of the August 7, 1945, edition of New York World-Telegram, featuring the atomic bombing of Hiroshima
- Type: Daily newspaper
- Format: Broadsheet
- Founder: James Gordon Bennett
- Founded: 1867; Renamed New York World-Telegram and The Sun in 1950
- Ceased publication: 1966
- Headquarters: New York City, U.S.

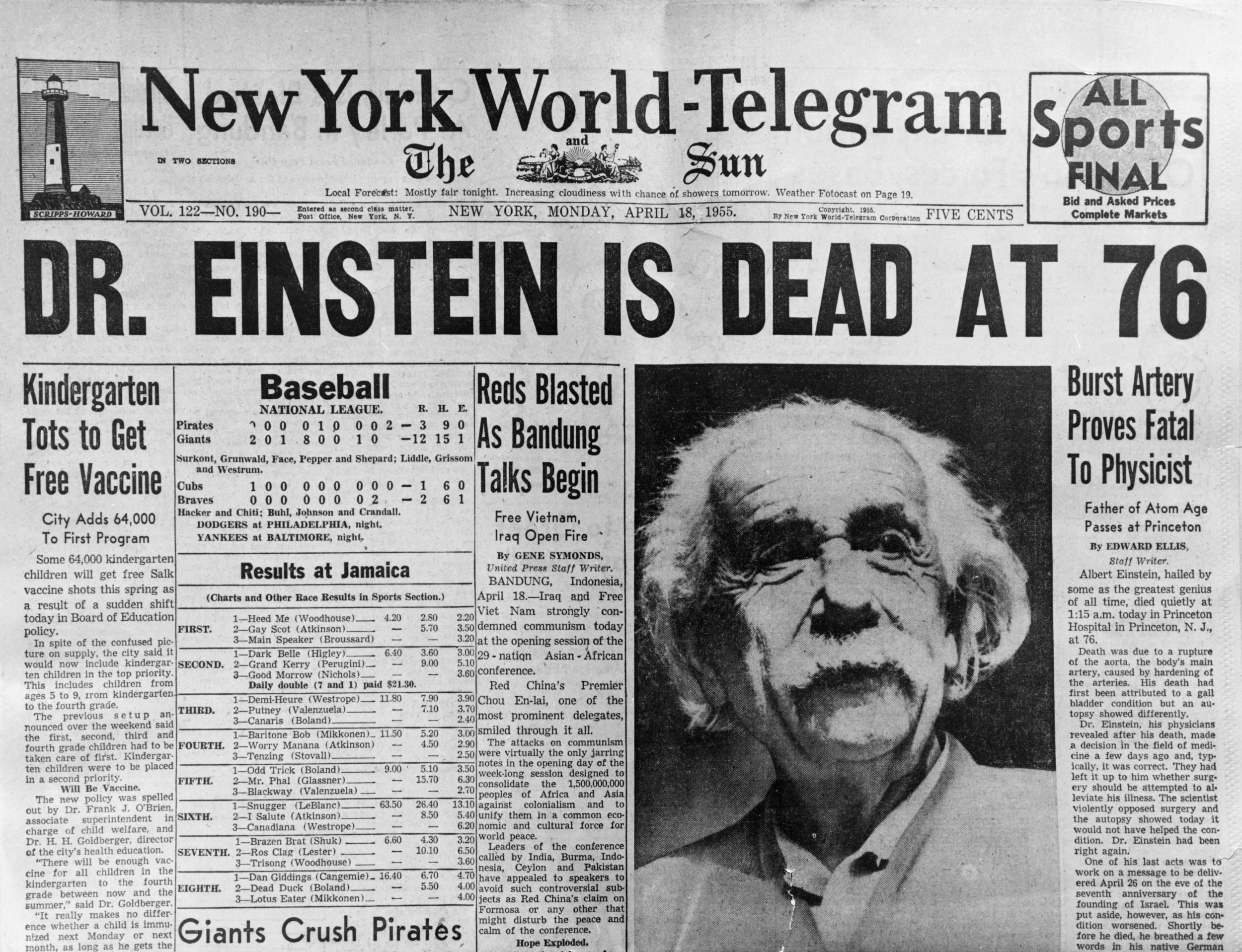
Cover of New York World-Telegram and The Sun on April 18, 1955, announcing the death of Albert Einstein

The New York World-Telegram, later known as the New York World-Telegram and The Sun, was a New York City newspaper from 1931 to 1966.

== History ==
Founded by James Gordon Bennett Sr. as The Evening Telegram in 1867, the newspaper began as the evening edition of The New York Herald, which itself published its first issue in 1835. Following Bennett's death, newspaper and magazine owner Frank A. Munsey purchased The Telegram in June 1920. Munsey's associate Thomas W. Dewart, the late publisher and president of the New York Sun, owned the paper for two years after Munsey died in 1925 before selling it to the E. W. Scripps Company for an undisclosed sum in 1927. At the time of the sale, the paper was known as The New York Telegram, and it had a circulation of 200,000.

The newspaper became the World-Telegram in 1931, following the sale of the New York World by the heirs of Joseph Pulitzer to Scripps Howard. More than 2,000 employees of the morning, evening and Sunday editions of the World lost their jobs in the merger, although some star writers, including Heywood Broun and Westbrook Pegler, were kept on the new paper.

The World-Telegram enjoyed a reputation as a liberal paper for some years after the merger, based on memories of the Pulitzer-owned World. However, under Scripps Howard the paper moved steadily to the right, eventually becoming a conservative bastion described by the press critic A.J. Liebling as "Republican, anti-labor, and suspicious of anything European." He also called the paper "the organ of New York's displaced persons (displaced from the interior of North America)".

In October 1936 the papers reporter H. R. Ekins won a race to travel around the world on commercial airline flights, beating Dorothy Kilgallen of the New York Journal and Leo Kieran of The New York Times. The race took 18 ½ days.

In 1940, the paper carried a series of articles entitled "The Rape of China," which used Walter Judd's experiences with Japanese soldiers as the basis of support for a campaign to boycott Japanese goods. Publisher Roy Howard, an expert of sorts after travelling to Manchuria and Japan in the early 1930s, gave extensive coverage of Japanese atrocities in China. The paper's headline of December 8, 1941, read "1500 Dead in Hawaii" in its coverage of Japan's attack on Pearl Harbor.

=== New York World-Telegram and The Sun ===
In 1950, the paper was renamed the New York World-Telegram and The Sun after the Dewart family sold Scripps the remnants of another New York afternoon paper, The Sun. Liebling once described The Sun on the combined publication's nameplate as resembling the tail feathers of a canary on the chin of a cat.

Beginning in July 1956, the paper became a center of attention when its reporters Gene Gleason and Fred J. Cook launched an investigative series on New York City Parks Commissioner Robert Moses. Gleason and Cook focused on possible corruption in how Moses was implementing "Title I: Slum Clearance & Community Development & Redevelopment" of the U.S. Housing Act of 1949. The information they revealed in the World-Telegram and Sun was a vital resource for Robert Caro's Pulitzer Prize-winning biography of Moses entitled The Power Broker (1974).

=== New York World Journal Tribune ===
Early in 1966, a proposal to create New York's first joint operating agreement (JOA) led to the merger of the World-Telegram and The Sun with Hearst's Journal American. The intention was to produce a joint afternoon edition, with a separate morning paper to be produced by the Herald Tribune. The last edition of the World-Telegram and The Sun was published on April 23, 1966. But when strikes prevented the JOA from taking effect, the papers instead united in August 1966 to become the short-lived New York World Journal Tribune, which lasted only until May 5, 1967. Its closure left New York City with three daily newspapers: The New York Times, New York Post, and New York Daily News.

The archives of the paper are not available online, but they can be accessed at the Library of Congress, the University of Wisconsin-Madison, and at several research facilities in the state of New York.

== Gallery ==
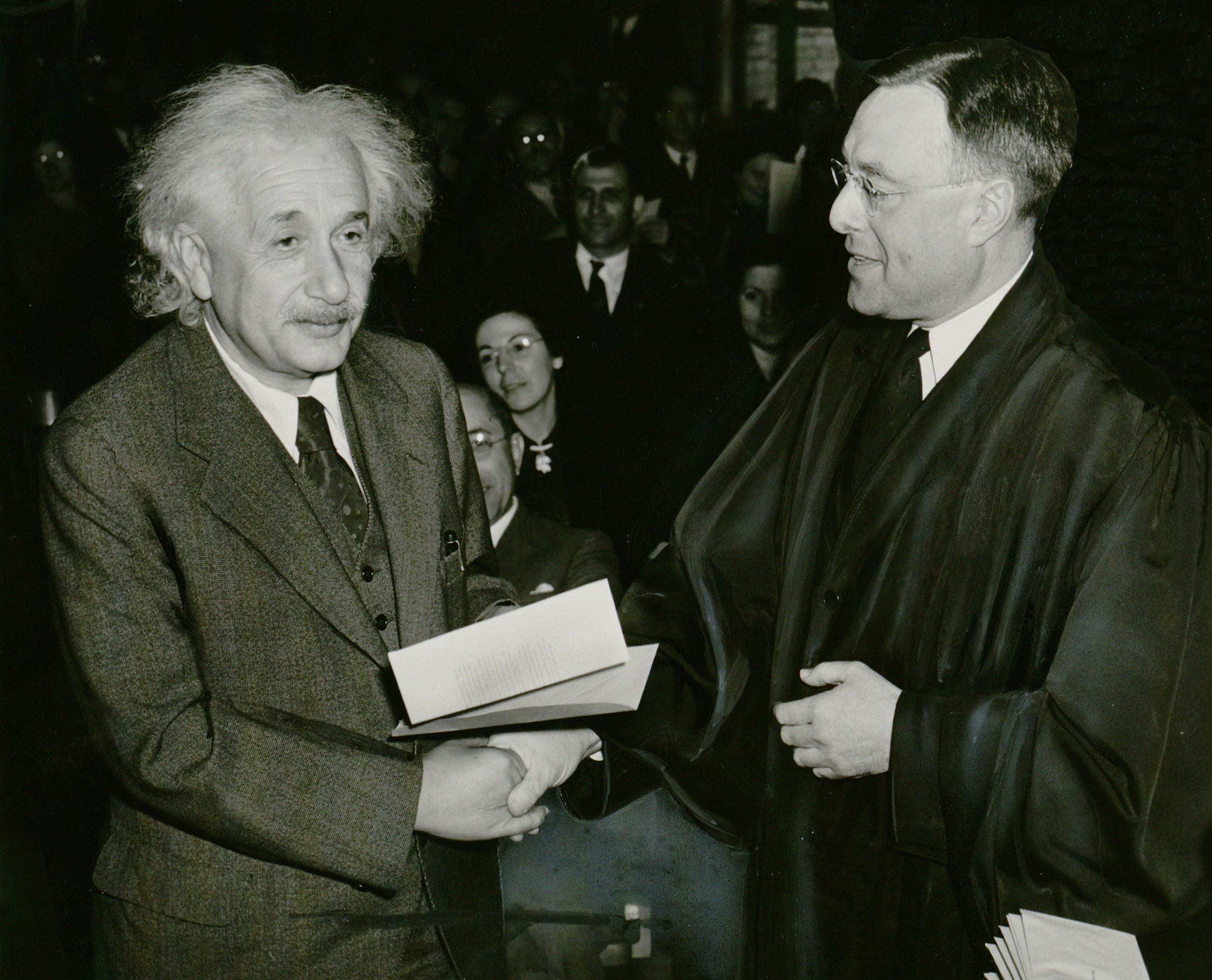
World-Telegram photo of Albert Einstein receiving his U.S. citizenship papers

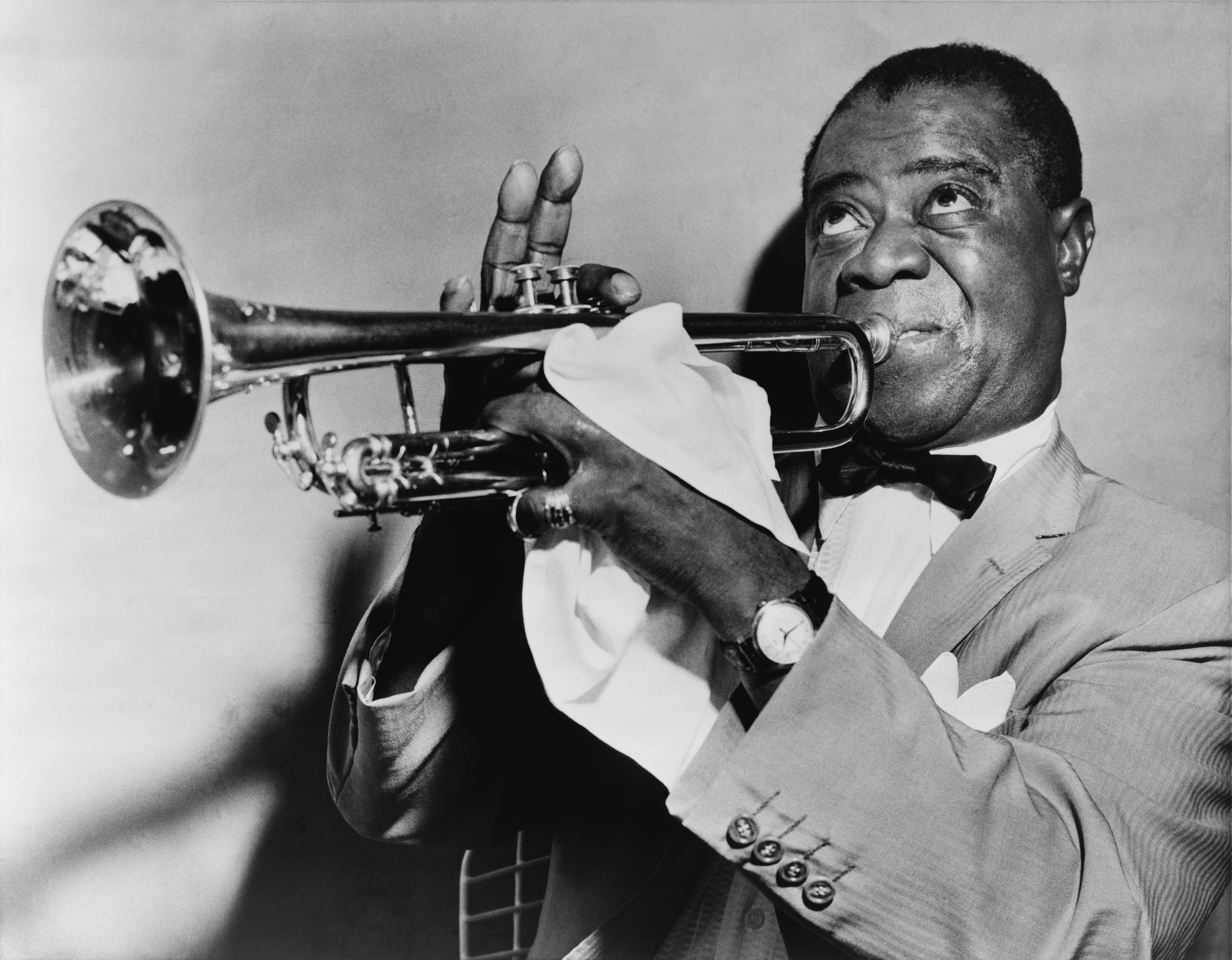
World-Telegram photo of Louis Armstrong

March on Washington for Jobs and Freedom, Bayard Rustin (l) and Cleveland Robinson

== See also ==
- Media of New York City
