= KLM West-Indisch Bedrijf =

Historic airlines of the Netherlands

IATA	ICAO	Call sign
KL	KLM	KLM
- Founded: 1934
- Commenced operations: 22 December 1934
- Ceased operations: 1 August 1964
- Hubs: Curaçao, Paramaribo
- Focus cities: Dutch West Indies, Venezuela
- Parent company: KLM
- Headquarters: Amstelveen, Netherlands
- Founder: Albert Plesman

KLM West-Indisch Bedrijf (WIB or KLM West Indies Company) was a subsidiary of KLM, which operated flights within the Dutch West-Indies (Netherlands Antilles and Suriname) and their neighbouring countries.

== History ==
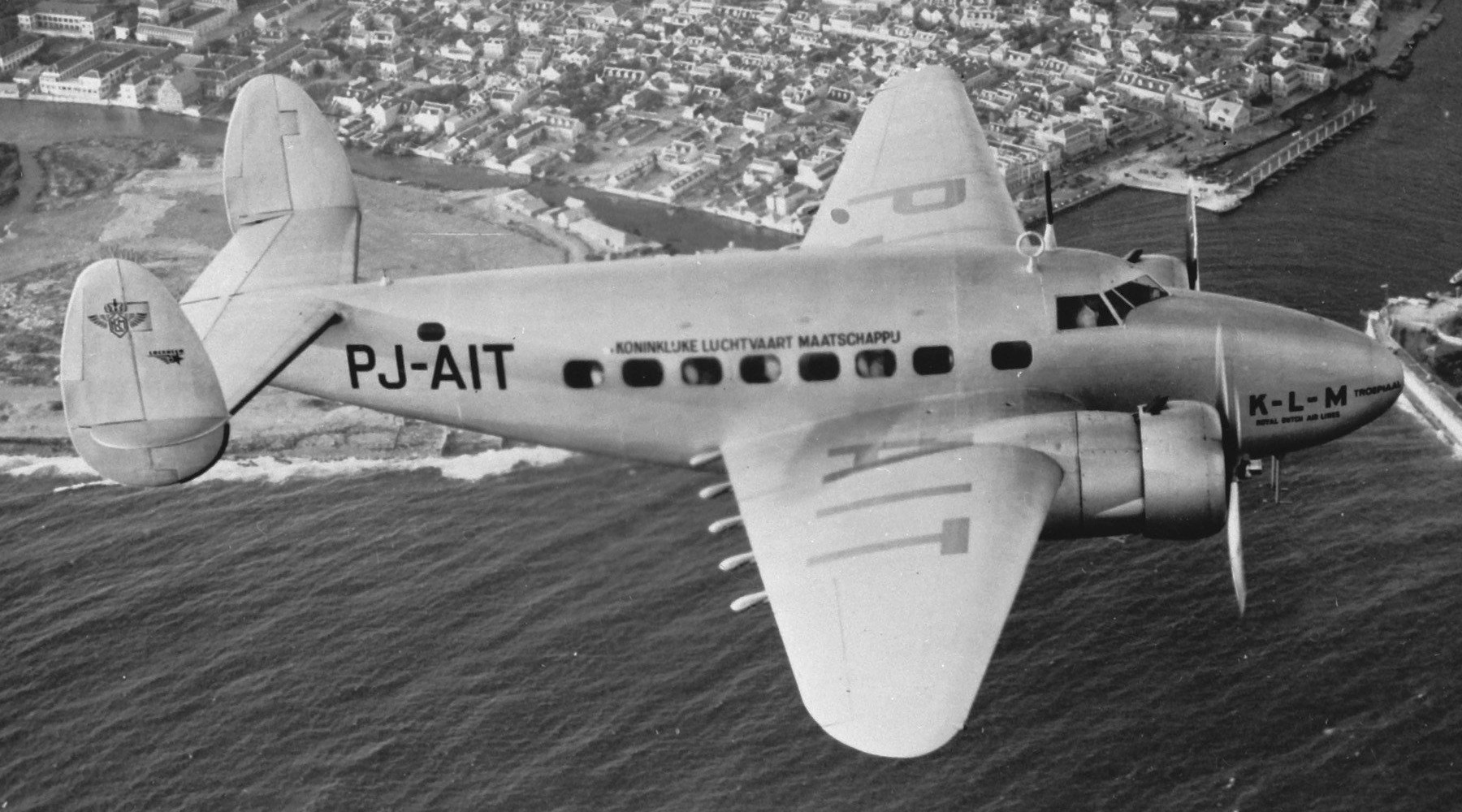
A KLM West-Indisch Lockheed 14 Super Electra on a flight from Curaçao to Miami in 1943

Its foundation was made possible partly by the insurance of the Dutch PTT, who offered a lucrative contract for delivering mail to the Dutch Colonies. The first mail flight arriving from the Netherlands to Curaçao by the Fokker F.XVIII PH-AIS "Snip" on 22 December 1934, marked the beginning of the company.

Initially, the West-Indisch Bedrijf mainly flew from Willemstad, Curaçao to Aruba (with the first flight occurring on 19 January 1935), Venezuela and Jamaica in cooperation with Koninklijke Nederlandse Stoomboot-Maatschappij (KNSM). Only after World War II regular flights Amsterdam-Curaçao occurred. World War II itself was of major importance to WIB. Because of the oil refineries in Aruba, WIB became a major transporter and one of the best-run airlines of its day.

On 1 August 1964, the West-Indisch Bedrijf was transformed into ALM Antillean Airlines, in which the Netherlands Antilles became a shareholder.

== Fleet ==
KLM West-Indisch Bedrijf operated the following aircraft:

KLM West-Indisch Bedrijf fleet
Aircraft	Total	Introduced	Retired	Notes
Convair CV-340	9	1953	1964	
Douglas C-47 Skytrain	10	1946	1960	
Douglas C-54 Skymaster	8	1946	1954	
Douglas DC-5	2	1950	1951	
Douglas DC-6	7	1957	1963	
fokker F.VIII	2	1937	1939	
Fokker F.XVIII	2	1935	1938	
Lockheed Model 12 Electra Junior	1	1944	1945	
Lockheed Model 14 Super Electra	4	1938	1948	
Lockheed Model 18 Lodestar	2	1943	1948	

== Accidents and incidents ==
- On 22 August 1942, Lockheed 14-WF62 Super Electra PJ-AIP Parkiet lost control just after takeoff and crashed near Piarco Airport for reasons unknown, killing all 13 on board. The cause of the crash was not determined, but poor weather conditions (storms and turbulence) were blamed.

== See also ==
- List of defunct airlines of the Netherlands Antilles
