= Ted Frank =

American lawyer (born 1968)

- Born: December 14, 1968 (age 57)
- Education: Brandeis University (BA); University of Chicago (JD)
- Occupation: Lawyer
- Years active: 1995–present

Theodore Harold Frank (born December 14, 1968) is an American lawyer, activist, and legal writer based in Washington, D.C. He is the counsel of record and petitioner in Frank v. Gaos, the first Supreme Court case to deal with the issue of cy pres in class action settlements; he is one of the few Supreme Court attorneys ever to argue his own case. He wrote the vetting report of vice-presidential candidate Sarah Palin for the John McCain campaign in the 2008 presidential election. He founded the Center for Class Action Fairness (CCAF) in 2009; it temporarily merged with the Competitive Enterprise Institute in 2015, but as of 2019 CCAF is now part of the new Hamilton Lincoln Law Institute, a free-market nonprofit public-interest law firm founded by Frank and his CCAF colleague Melissa Holyoak.

The New York Times calls him the "leading critic of abusive class-action settlements"; The Wall Street Journal has referred to him as "a leading tort-reform advocate" and praised his work exposing dubious practices by plaintiffs' attorneys in class actions.

Frank graduated from Brandeis University in 1991, and the University of Chicago Law School in 1994 with a JD degree. A litigator from 1995 to 2005, and a former clerk for Frank H. Easterbrook on the Seventh Circuit Court of Appeals, Frank was a director and fellow of the Legal Center for the Public Interest at the American Enterprise Institute in Washington, D.C. He was an adjunct fellow at Manhattan Institute's Center for Legal Policy, where he was editor of the institute's web magazine, PointofLaw.com. He was on the executive committee of the Federalist Society's Litigation Practice Group and contributed to conservative legal weblogs, and, as of 2008, was a member of the American Law Institute.

== Background and early career ==
Frank was born in 1968. He is a grandson of journalist Nelson Frank, a nephew of author Johanna Hurwitz, and a cousin of the politics editor of The Atlantic Online, Garance Franke-Ruta.

He graduated from the Benjamin Franklin High School in New Orleans, then earned his Bachelor of Arts degree in economics from Brandeis University in May 1991. He wrote columns for his campus newspaper and political magazines and was a member of the student senate. He objected to a campaign to stop serving pork at the Jewish university, which was noted in The New York Times.

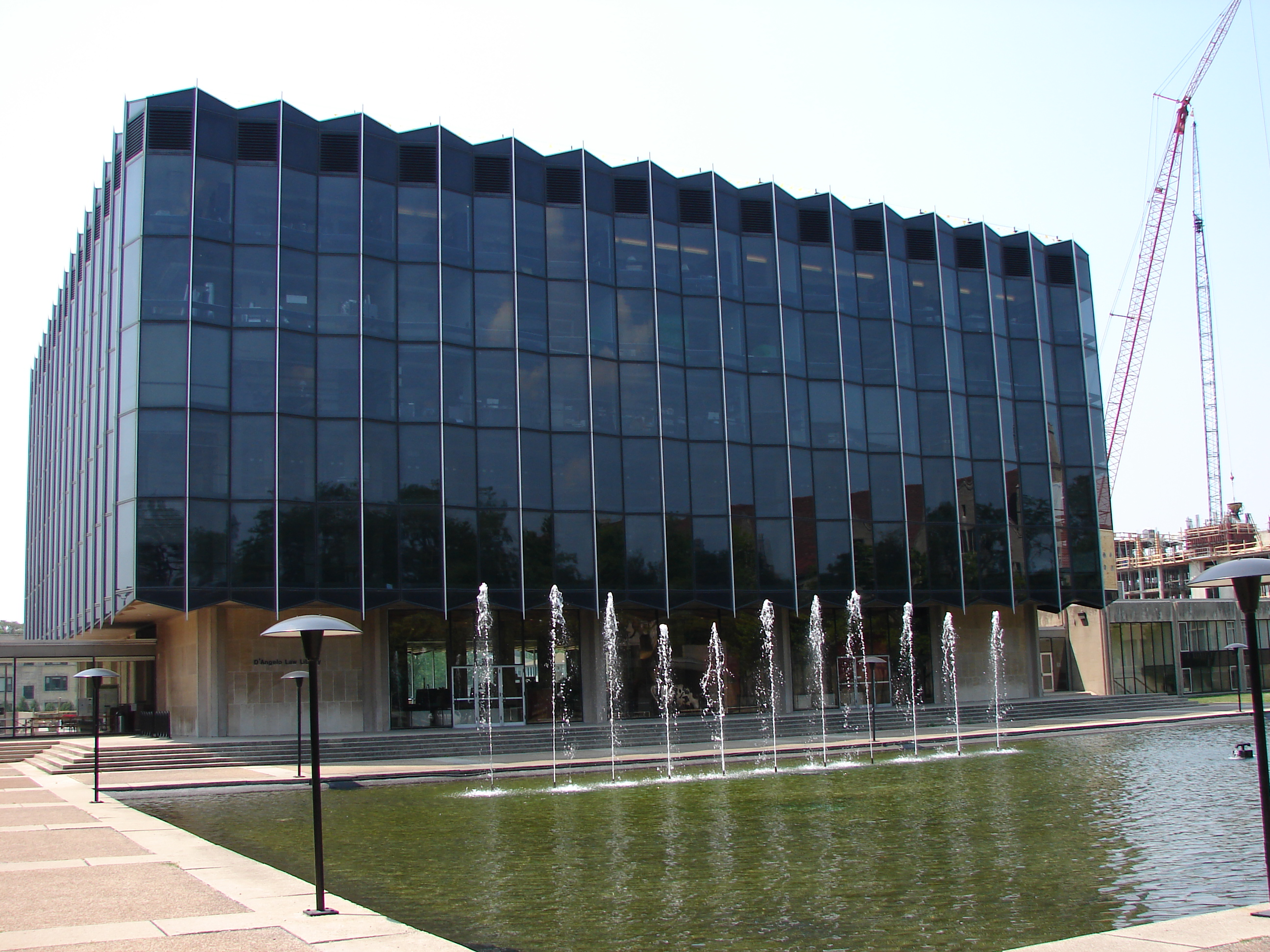
University of Chicago Law School where Frank graduated from in 1994

In 1994 Frank earned his Juris Doctor with high honors from the University of Chicago Law School. At Chicago he earned Order of the Coif and served on the law review. While at Chicago Law, he was a known presence on Usenet groups and researched urban legends; he was an early contributor to the Baseball Prospectus collective through essays on the Usenet group rec.sport.baseball. He has also been described as a contributor along with snopes of "trolling for newbies" and also as one of the "most consistent posters of serious research".

After clerking for Judge Frank H. Easterbrook of the United States Court of Appeals for the Seventh Circuit, Frank entered private practice between 1995 and 2005 as a litigator on class action tort cases at law firms Kirkland & Ellis, Irell & Manella, and O’Melveny & Myers. Among his earliest cases were two sudden acceleration cases, where he represented the automakers.

== Advocacy of tort reform ==
The whole point of a class action is to generate efficiencies that wouldn't be possible in individual actions—so why are the attorneys taking a one-third contingent fee instead of a much smaller percentage?

— Frank, questioning the class action system. May 2005.

In 2003, Frank began contributing regularly to Overlawyered, a legal weblog edited by Walter Olson that advocates tort reform; he continued there through 2010.

Frank joined the American Enterprise Institute in 2005 when AEI offered him a fellowship to research the effects of the Class Action Fairness Act. As the director of the AEI Legal Center for the Public Interest he spoke and wrote about civil justice issues and liability. Frank also sits on the executive committee of the Federalist Society's Litigation Practice Group.

Frank is a leading proponent for tort reform in the United States. According to Frank, he became disillusioned at class action tactics, and the willingness of judges to approve settlements he felt were poor for consumers. He has strongly criticized obesity lawsuits, calling them "rent-seeking vehicles that are neither good law nor good public policy."

In April 2008, several members of Congress brought up the Lilly Ledbetter Fair Pay Act under Title VII, a revision of law "to state that prior acts outside the 180-day statute of limitations could be included", affecting employment financial issues. Frank was against the revision, saying that wages and hiring would be reduced to counter the possibility of litigation from a hired employee. The law was eventually passed in January 2009.

In February 2011, Frank was part of a three-member panel at Vanderbilt University in Tennessee which consisted of himself, James Blumstein, who is a law professor at the university, and Charlie Ross, a former State Senator in Mississippi, presenting their perspectives on how the business and people of the state would benefit from tort reform. Frank and the other panelists argued that "Tennessee’s current civil justice system is both inconsistent and unsustainable" and it was argued that, based on reforms in other states, a reform in this area could result in 30,000 jobs a year or 577 jobs each week in Tennessee and significantly improve the health system.

=== Issues and conflicts ===
In 2006, Frank published an op-ed in The Washington Post arguing for various tort reforms and criticizing the Association of Trial Lawyers of America for "show[ing] much more of an interest in benefiting trial lawyers than in fairness or justice. Jon Haber, CEO of ATLA, responded in the Post, accusing Frank of proposing to destroy "the nation's civil justice system to benefit the insurance industry, drug companies and other corporate powers", of a "laughable" claim that too many lawsuits "may transform the nation into a 'banana republic'", of "find[ing] the fight for justice trivial" and making "nothing more than an attack on the Constitution of the United States". The next day, Frank described Haber's op-ed as "a collection of ad hominems and insults and non sequiturs", "purport[ing] to be responding to [Frank, but] in fact responding to a fictional straw-man". He accused Haber of "dishonest change of subject: at no point does Haber defend the lawsuits I actually criticize", and ended by noting that Haber did not respond to "the most important part of my op-ed" about "trial lawyers ... trying to undo [the concept that a deal is a deal] retroactively".

In a Wall Street Journal opinion piece in 2007, Frank said that the Department of Treasury and SEC should urge the Supreme Court to reject expanded securities litigation liability in Stoneridge v. Scientific-Atlanta. Congressmen John Conyers, Jr. and Barney Frank criticized this op-ed in their saying that Frank's argument substituted policy considerations for the plain text of statute. Frank rebutted the allegation on the Overlawyered weblog. Also in 2007, Frank posted an article regarding tort trial lawyer Arthur Alan Wolk on Overlawyered, a website he has regularly posted on since 2003 about tort reform issues, that prompted Wolk to sue Frank for defamation. The case was dismissed as barred by the one year statute of limitations. On appeal, the Reporters Committee for Freedom of the Press, the Society of Professional Journalists, the American Society of News Editors, The New York Times, The Washington Post, the Associated Press, and law professors and First Amendment experts Eugene Volokh and Glenn Reynolds, among others, filed amicus briefs in support of the defendants saying that there was no actionable claim of libel.

Frank, who worked on the Vioxx case early in his career, was called "perhaps the loudest critic of the Vioxx litigation," and debated trial lawyer Mark Lanier about the issue. Frank continued his criticism in a 2011 article. "A final sordid chapter in the tort litigation over Vioxx closed, as Judge Eldon Fallon divvied up $315 million to be paid to the plaintiffs' attorneys who worked on the litigation. This sum was in addition to the more than $1.2 billion already paid to such attorneys. When you add in what Merck paid to plaintiffs and for its own attorneys, the Vioxx litigation cost it more than $7 billion. Yet Merck almost certainly did not do anything wrong. Even as an unsympathetic corporate defendant, it won the vast majority of cases that went to trial, and another dozen or more that plaintiffs' attorneys dismissed on the eve of trial rather than risk the publicity of a certain loss. Even in the handful of cases that Merck lost at trial, such as the $253 million verdict in the Ernst case that generated much of the publicity that led to tens of thousands of cases being filed, Merck won reversals of most of those on appeal because the verdicts were based on conclusory junk-science expert testimony that should not have been admitted into evidence." Lanier defended the settlement as fair.

== Sarah Palin vetting ==
According to the book Game Change: Obama and the Clintons, McCain and Palin, and the Race of a Lifetime, on the weekend before John McCain made his vice-presidential pick, McCain's advisor Arthur Culvahouse asked Frank to prepare a written report on Sarah Palin, "Thrown together from scratch in less than forty hours, the document highlighted her vulnerabilities: "Democrats upset at McCain's anti-Obama 'celebrity' advertisements will mock Palin as an inexperienced beauty queen whose main national exposure was a photo-spread in Vogue in February 2008. Even in campaigning for governor, she made a number of gaffes, and the Anchorage Daily News expressed concern that she often seemed 'unprepared or over her head' in a campaign run by a friend." The book also says that Frank worked on the vetting of Senator Joe Lieberman. The report was widely criticized; GQ has cited the report as "the most infamous document in veep-vetting history." In Mark Halperin and John Heilemann's book Race of a Lifetime: How Obama Won the White House (2011), they describe the vetting at length. Frank has defended the report as "exhaustive" and covering "almost everything that would eventually dog her on the campaign trail." In the HBO film Game Change, Frank was played by Brian d'Arcy James.

== Center for Class Action Fairness ==
Operating largely on donations, the CCAF in a short period has gained a reputation as a formidable check on highly questionable practices that have gone unchallenged precisely because they are the product of collusive parties and allied judges. The advent of a committed and aggressive watchdog like CCAF is, to those familiar with these scams, like sunlight and Lysol.

— Karen Lee Torre of the Connecticut Law Tribune describing the Center for Class Action Fairness (CCAF).

In 2009, Frank founded the non-profit Center for Class Action Fairness (CCAF) to represent consumers dissatisfied with their counsel in class actions and class action settlements. CCAF is now part of the Hamilton Lincoln Law Institute, which Frank co-founded in late 2018. It aims to expose settlement flaws, which he says often pay more to trial lawyers than to their clients. His goal "is to make it more difficult and less profitable for lawyers to pursue what he considers to be abusive suits." CCAF has won over $100 million for class members and several landmark cases. In a securities case involving Citigroup, Frank exposed overbilling by the plaintiffs lawyers and won $26.7 million for shareholders. Frank won reversal of a "worthless" settlement involving Subway footlong sandwiches paying class members nothing.

Frank founded CCAF after his successful objection to the proposed class action settlement in the Grand Theft Auto consumer fraud case. Under the settlement, class members who had bought a Grand Theft Auto: San Andreas video game with a hidden, sexually explicit easter egg would have received less than $30,000, while the plaintiffs' attorneys would receive $1 million in legal fees. The court rejected the settlement on other grounds, but the case spurred Frank to devote himself to objecting to class action settlements, and he left AEI.

CCAF has objected to settlements throughout the United States, in cases where class action lawyers receive cash payments but the plaintiff class receives only discount coupons for further products and services from the defendant company. CCAF argues in those cases that few of the coupons are ever used, so the actual payment to plaintiffs is much lower than the stated amounts. In 2010, CCAF successfully objected to a coupon settlement in a Central District of California class action alleging consumer fraud in the sale of Honda Civic Hybrids; the settlement would have provided $2.95 million in attorneys' fees, but only coupons to the class. Frank was reported to have said, "coupons are nearly worthless because so few of the intended beneficiaries will find it worthwhile to fill in all the necessary paperwork." The CCAF has also been involved in the case surrounding the allegations of email spamming by TD Ameritrade in 2009. The case brought Frank before Northern District of California Chief Judge Vaughn Walker, where he challenged the fairness of a settlement, which consisted of coupons for antivirus software. Frank "argued that the court should not award, or should at least limit, the requested $1.87 million in attorney fees." Judge Walker rejected the settlement in October 2009.

CCAF has been effective in challenging disclosure-only settlements, the result of litigation when two companies merge. Disclosure-only settlements can generate legal fees for lawyers but no money for the shareholders they represent. Frank objected to a settlement involving Walgreens and a Swiss pharmacy chain. Judge Richard Posner, one of the most influential federal judges not on the Supreme Court, said “The type of class action illustrated by this case … is no better than a racket. It must end.”

Some attorneys question how much weight some of Frank's objections should be given. Brian Kabateck, a class action plaintiffs' lawyer with Kabateck Brown Kellner, says that “He has delayed otherwise good settlements for, in some cases, years.” He also questioned Frank's motivation. Frank says his motivation is to improve the system, although he admits to having advocated for these changes for a long time. But Bloomberg Businessweek reports that “substantially fewer merger lawsuits are being filed today” and attributes that to Frank and those he's encouraged. CCAF does not accept payments to drop objections to settlements, although sometimes their clients will. CCAF won an appeal in the United States Court of Appeals for the Seventh Circuit over the right of class members to challenge payments to objectors. The case was remanded to the district court to allow Frank to conduct discovery into the allegedly improper payments. Upon review, the district court rejected Frank's challenge to the payments, finding that "the record failed to confirm Frank's suspicions of blackmail or other wrongdoing." Frank won reversal of this decision on appeal, and the Seventh Circuit ordered disgorgement.

=== Cy pres and Frank v. Gaos ===
Frank is one of the notable critics of the use of cy pres in the class action system, and testified against the practice before Congress. At CCAF he won several cases restoring cy pres awards of millions of dollars to consumers and shareholders.

In 2013, Frank unsuccessfully sought certiorari to a challenge to an all-cy-pres settlement involving Facebook in Marek v. Lane; however, Chief Justice John Roberts wrote separately to suggest the Court had “fundamental concerns” about the issue.

Frank challenged a 2014 cy pres settlement involving Google. (Note: Google Referrer Header Privacy Litigation, 10-cv-04809, U.S. District Court, Northern District of California (San Jose)) Under the proposed settlement terms, the three lawyers in the case would receive over $2 million (an hourly rate of $1000/hour) and the named plaintiffs would receive $5,000 apiece, while an additional $6 million would be given to several privacy groups as cy pres in lieu of compensation to then remaining unnamed class action members, due to the cost of administering the payout to those estimated 129 million individuals and the low amount of compensation (an estimated four cents if every class member made a claim). The privacy groups that would receive some of the money included each of the three lawyers' alma maters and several groups that Google has supported. The district court judge in the case, Judge Edward Davila, noted "the elephant in the room is that many of them are law schools that you attended. ... I’m disappointed that the usual suspects are still usual." Bloomberg News stated that Judge Davlia remarked that the lack of transparency in selecting the recipients of the money "raises a red flag" and "doesn’t pass the smell test", although it was nonetheless approved.

The Ninth Circuit Court of Appeals upheld the use of cy pres, noting that otherwise the estimated 129 million web users that could theoretically receive damages from the suit would receive "a paltry 4 cents in recovery." Frank had argued that similar settlements such as Fraley v. Facebook had successfully distributed small sums to large classes through a claims process; because few class members make claims, $15 and more were easily distributed to claimants.

Frank successfully sought a writ of certiorari at the U.S. Supreme Court. The Center for Constitutional Jurisprudence, Cato Institute, Center for Individual Rights, and Attorney General of Arizona, in a brief joined by 15 other states, filed amicus curiae briefs urging the court to grant certiorari. The court granted certiorari on April 30, 2018. Frank argued the case October 31, 2018.

== Gay rights activism ==
In response to the Chick-fil-A same-sex marriage controversy, Frank created the "Chicken Offset" website to permit gay-rights supporters to offset their purchases of Chick-fil-A with donations to charities that supported gay people. Frank also co-hosted a benefit to protect same-sex marriage in Maryland.
