= Jeremy Lott =

American writer and pundit (born 1978)

- Born: October 1, 1978 (age 47)
- Education: Trinity Western University
- Occupations: Writer, editor

Jeremy Lott (born October 1, 1978) is an American writer, editor, and pundit. He briefly worked at the news website Rare. Previously, Lott was the editor of Real Clear Religion and associate editor of Real Clear Science. Lott has written several books and articles, with his work appearing in well over 100 publications, including the National Post, Australian Financial Review, the Financial Times, the Guardian, Politico, and The American Prospect.

Lott has previously worked at the Cato Institute, Capital Research Center, American Spectator, and the Competitive Enterprise Institute. From 2006–2007 he was the Warren T. Brookes Journalism Fellow at CEI. Although much of Lott's past employment has been associated with conservative and libertarian organizations, he publishes frequently in left-leaning The Guardian.

Lott holds a B.A. from Trinity Western University in religious studies and lives bicoastal between Lynden, Washington and Fairfax, Virginia.

== Publications ==
- Lott, Jeremy (2006). In Defense of Hypocrisy: Picking Sides in the War on Virtue Thomas Nelson. ISBN 978-1-59555-052-1
- Lott, Jeremy (2008). The Warm Bucket Brigade: The Story of the American Vice Presidency Thomas Nelson. ISBN 978-1-59555-082-8. A light-hearted history of the vice-presidency, "an altogether amusing, digressive account"
- Mandel, Marvin; Lott, Jeremy (2010). I'll Never Forget It: Memoirs of a Political Accident from East Baltimore The Maryland Public Policy Institute. ISBN 978-0-9755756-3-5
- Lott, Jeremy (2010). William F. Buckley (Christian Encounters Series)Thomas Nelson. ISBN 978-1-59555-065-1
