= Regulation (magazine) =

Cato Institute periodical

- Categories: Policy
- Frequency: Quarterly
- First issue: July/August 1977; 48 years ago
- Company: Cato Institute
- Country: United States
- Based in: Washington, D.C.
- Language: English
- Website: www.cato.org/regulation/
- ISSN: 0147-0590

Regulation is a quarterly periodical about policy published by the Cato Institute. It was started as a bimonthly magazine in 1977 by the American Enterprise Institute and acquired by Cato in 1989. Past editors have included former Supreme Court justice Antonin Scalia, Murray Weidenbaum, Christopher DeMuth, Walter Olson, and Peter Huber. Peter Van Doren has edited the magazine since 1999.

In the late 1970s and early 1980s, the magazine was pivotal in promoting deregulation and the importance of cost–benefit analysis.

== See also ==
- Cato Journal, a peer-reviewed academic journal published by the Cato Institute.
- Cato Unbound, a monthly web-only publication of the Cato Institute featuring a discussion between a lead essayist and three other participants.
