= Blumstein =

Blumstein is a Jewish artificial surname Blume + Stein. Notable people with this surname include:

- Alfred Blumstein (1930–2026), American scientist
- Anita Blumstein, burth name of Anita B. Brody (born 1935), American judge
- Daniel T. Blumstein, ethologist and conservation biologist
- Gil Blumstein (born 1990), Israeli professional footballer
- James Blumstein, an American legal and health scholar
- Scott Blumstein (born 1992), American poker player
- Sheila E. Blumstein (born 1944), a professor emerita of cognitive, linguistic and psychological sciences
