= Competitive Enterprise Institute =

American think tank

Coordinates: 38.9040°N 77.0431°W

- Abbreviation: CEI
- Formation: 1984; 42 years ago
- Founder: Fred L. Smith Jr.
- Type: Public policy think tank
- Tax ID no.: 52-1351785
- Headquarters: 1310 L Street NW, Washington, D.C. 20036
- President and CEO: Kent Lassman
- Revenue: $12.9 million (2025)
- Expenses: $9.11 million (2025)
- Staff: 53 (2024)
- Volunteers: 10 (2024)
- Website: www.cei.org

The Competitive Enterprise Institute (CEI) is a non-profit libertarian think tank founded by the political writer Fred L. Smith Jr. on March 9, 1984, in Washington, D.C., to advance principles of limited government, free enterprise, and individual liberty. CEI focuses on a number of regulatory policy issues, including business and finance, labor, technology and telecommunications, transportation, food and drug regulation, and energy and environment in which they have promoted climate change denial. Kent Lassman is the current president and CEO.

According to the 2017 Global Go To Think Tank Index Report (Think Tanks and Civil Societies Program, University of Pennsylvania), CEI was number 59 (of 90) in the "Top Think Tanks in the United States".

== Policy areas ==
=== Energy and environment ===
Academic research has identified CEI as one of the think tanks funded to overturn the environmentalism of the 1960s, central to promoting climate change denial. It was involved in assisting the anti-environmental climate change policy of the George W. Bush administration. CEI promotes environmental policies based on limited government regulation and property rights, rejects what it calls "global warming alarmism", and denies the science of climate change.

CEI is an opponent of government action by the Environmental Protection Agency that would require limits on greenhouse gas emissions. It favors free-market environmentalism and supports the idea that market institutions are more effective in protecting the environment than is government. In 2016, CEI president Kent Lassman wrote on the organization's blog that, "there is no debate about whether the Earth's climate is warming", that "human activities very likely contribute to that warming", and that "this has long been the CEI's position". In March 1992, CEI's founder Fred Smith said of global warming: "Most of the indications right now are it looks pretty good. Warmer winters, warmer nights, no effects during the day because of clouding, sounds to me like we're moving to a more benign planet, more rain, richer, easier productivity to agriculture."

In May 2006, CEI's global warming policy activities attracted attention as it embarked upon an ad campaign with two television commercials. These ads promote carbon dioxide as a positive factor in the environment and argue that global warming is not a concern. One ad focuses on the message that CO_{2} is misrepresented as a pollutant, stating that "it's essential to life. We breathe it out. Plants breathe it in... They call it pollution. We call it life." The other states that the world's glaciers are "growing, not melting... getting thicker, not thinner." It cites Science articles to support its claims. However, the editor of Science stated that the ad "misrepresents the conclusions of the two cited Science papers... by selective referencing". The author of the articles, Curt Davis, director of the Center for Geospatial Intelligence at the University of Missouri, said CEI was misrepresenting his previous research to inflate their claims. "These television ads are a deliberate effort to confuse and mislead the public about the global warming debate," Davis said.

In 2009, CEI's director of energy and global warming policy told The Washington Post, "The only thing that's been demonstrated to reduce emissions is economic collapse". In 2014, CEI sued the White House Office of Science and Technology Policy over a video that linked the polar vortex to climate change.

=== Regulatory reform ===
CEI advocates for regulatory reform on a range of policy issues, including energy, environment, business and finance, labor, technology and telecommunications, transportation, and food and drug regulation.

Its annual survey of the federal regulatory state "Ten Thousand Commandments: An Annual Snapshot of the Federal Regulatory State," documents the size, scope, and cost of federal regulations, and how the U.S. regulatory burden affects American consumers, businesses, and the economy. CEI's Clyde Wayne Crews Jr. coined the phrase "regulatory dark matter," referencing astrophysics to distinguish between ordinary government regulations or "visible matter," and "regulatory dark matter," which consists of "thousands of executive branch and federal agency proclamations and issuances, including memos, guidance documents, bulletins, circulars and announcements with practical regulatory effect."

=== Technology and telecommunications ===
In 2015, CEI filed an amicus brief in support of the petitioners in U.S. Telecom v. FCC. The brief argued that "Congress did not authorize the FCC to regulate the Internet when it enacted Section 706 of the Telecommunications Act [of 1996] and, in fact, placed it outside the scope of the FCC's rulemaking authority."

CEI has argued against using antitrust regulation to break up big technology companies such as Facebook and Google.

=== Capitalism ===
CEI has a longstanding project to recapture what they term "the moral legitimacy of capitalism" through research, writing, events, and other outreach activities. In 2019, CEI's vice president for Strategy Iain Murray argued, in an op-ed for The Wall Street Journal, that advocates of capitalism and free markets had taken the support of social conservatives for granted.

=== Project 2025 ===
CEI was a member of the advisory board of Project 2025, a collection of conservative and right-wing policy proposals from the Heritage Foundation to reshape the United States federal government and consolidate executive power should the Republican nominee win the 2024 presidential election, from June 2022 through March 2024.

== Legal advocacy ==
The Competitive Enterprise Institute "is one of a small number of think tanks that have a litigation arm to their organization, according to an editorial in the Wall Street Journal."

=== Center for Class Action Fairness (former project) ===
From 2015 to 2019, the Center for Class Action Fairness (CCAF) was part of CEI. It has since spun off as part of the new Hamilton Lincoln Law Institute, a free-market nonprofit public-interest law founded by former CEI attorneys Ted Frank and Melissa Holyoak. CCAF represents class members against what it calls, "unfair class action procedures and settlements."

CEI and Frank argued Frank v. Gaos before the U.S. Supreme Court on October 31, 2018, opposing a proposed class action settlement involving Google, who paid out an $8.5 million settlement including $6 million in cy-près funds and more than $2 million for class-action lawyers. Class members were not awarded any part of the settlement.

In 2015, CEI and Frank successfully appealed a class action settlement in a case about the length of Subway's "footlong" sandwiches. CEI argued that the proposed settlement benefited only nine people in the class but awarded more than half a million dollars to the class attorneys. Judge Diane Sykes's ruling rejected the settlement in the Subway case that would have paid plaintiffs' attorneys $525,000 and left the class with nothing. The court's decision included the statement that "[a] class settlement that results in fees for class counsel but yields no meaningful relief for the class is no better than a racket."

=== Challenges to the Affordable Care Act ===
CEI funded and coordinated King v. Burwell and Halbig v. Burwell, two lawsuits that challenged the Internal Revenue Service's implementation of the Affordable Care Act. The strategy of bringing such lawsuits was pioneered by Michael S. Greve, former chairman of CEI's board of directors, who stated: "This bastard [the act] has to be killed as a matter of political hygiene. I do not care how this is done, whether it's dismembered, whether we drive a stake through its heart, whether we tar and feather it, and drive it out of town, whether we strangle it." The King v. Burwell suit alleged that the IRS's implementation violated the statute and sought to block "a major portion of Obamacare: the subsidies that more than 6 million middle-income people, across more than 30 states, now receive to buy health insurance." CEI general counsel Sam Kazman argued in a USA Today op-ed that the disputed IRS rule "raises a basic issue that goes far beyond Obamacare: Do agencies have to follow the laws enacted by Congress, or can they rewrite them?" The case made its way to the Supreme Court, which is a 6–3 decision rejected the challenge and upheld the ACA subsidies.

=== Challenges to the Dodd-Frank Act and financial regulation ===
In 2012, the CEI, along with the conservative activist group 60 Plus Association, filed a lawsuit against the Consumer Financial Protection Bureau (CFPB). The CEI's suit alleges that the Dodd-Frank Wall Street Reform and Consumer Protection Act's creation of the CFPB violates the constitutional separation of powers. The CEI also contends that President Obama's recess appointment of Richard Cordray as CFPB director was unconstitutional and that the powers of the Financial Stability Oversight Council, created by Dodd-Frank, are unconstitutional. In 2016, a federal judge rejected the challenge to Cordray's appointment. The CEI's challenge to the constitutionality of CFPB remains pending in the federal courts.

== CEI projects ==
=== Warren T. Brookes Journalism Fellowship ===
In 1991, CEI established the Warren T. Brookes Journalism Fellowship to identify and train journalists who wish to improve their knowledge of environmental issues and free-market economics. In this manner, the program sought to perpetuate the legacy of Warren Brookes, who was a longtime journalist with the Boston Herald and the Detroit News and a nationally syndicated columnist. The fellowship ended in 2015. Former fellows include:

1993–1994	Ronald Bailey
1994–1995	Michael Fumento
1995–1996	Michelle Malkin
1996–1997	James Bovard
1997–1998	Jesse Walker
1999–2000	Brian Doherty
2000–2001	Sean Paige
2001–2002	Eileen Ciesla-Norcross
2002–2003	Hugo Gurdon
2003–2004	Neil Hrab
2004–2005	John Berlau
2005–2006	Timothy P. Carney
2006–2007	Jeremy Lott
2007–2008	Lene Johansen
2008–2009	Silvia Santacruz
2009–2010	Ryan Young
2010–2011	Kathryn Ciano
2011–2012	Matt Patterson
2012–2013	Matthew Melchiorre
2013–2014	Bill Frezza
2014–2015	Carrie Sheffield

=== Bureaucrash ===
Bureaucrash was a special outreach and activist project of CEI described as an international network of pro-freedom activists working to promote a political ideology based on personal and economic freedom. It conducted political activism using new media, creative marketing, and education campaigns. The project maintained a website (bureaucrash.com), which as of November 2023 is now only a web redirect to CEI's main website.

== Funding ==
CEI is funded by donations from individuals, foundations and corporations. Donors to CEI include a number of companies in the energy, technology, automotive, and alcohol and tobacco industries.

CEI's revenues for the fiscal year ending on September 30, 2015, were $7.5 million against expenses of $7.4 million.
