= Frank v. Gaos =

- Supreme Court of the United States

Argued October 31, 2018 Decided March 20, 2019
- Full case name: Theodore H. Frank, et al. v. Paloma Gaos, et al.
- Docket no.: 17-961
- Citations: 586 U.S. ___ (more) 139 S. Ct. 1041; 203 L. Ed. 2d 404

Case history
- Prior: In re Google Referrer Header Privacy Litig., 87 F. Supp. 3d 1122 (N.D. Cal. 2015); affirmed, 869 F.3d 737 (9th Cir. 2017); cert. granted, 138 S. Ct. 1697 (2018).

Holding
- The case was remanded for the courts below to address the plaintiffs' standing in light of Spokeo, Inc. v. Robins

Court membership
- Chief Justice John Roberts Associate Justices Clarence Thomas · Ruth Bader Ginsburg; Stephen Breyer · Samuel Alito; Sonia Sotomayor · Elena Kagan; Neil Gorsuch · Brett Kavanaugh

Case opinions
- Per curiam
- Dissent: Thomas

Frank v. Gaos, 586 U.S. ___ (2019), was a per curiam decision by the Supreme Court of the United States in a case concerning the practice of cy pres settlements in class action lawsuits. Following oral argument, the court asked the parties to submit supplemental briefs addressing whether the parties had Article III standing to pursue the case in federal courts. Supplemental briefing was completed on December 21, 2018. On March 20, 2019, the court remanded the case to the Ninth Circuit to address the plaintiffs’ standing in light of Spokeo, Inc. v. Robins.

== Background and lower court decisions ==
In 2010, several individuals, including lead plaintiff Paloma Gaos, brought a class action against Google for allegedly leaking, in violation of privacy laws, information about their search terms to third parties by including search terms in the referrer header. (Note: In re Google Referrer Header Privacy Litigation, 5:10-cv-04809, U.S. District Court, Northern District of California (San Jose)) After four days of negotiations, both sides agreed to a settlement, which requires approval by the presiding judge in the case to determine whether, per Rule 23(e)(2) of the Federal Rules of Civil Procedure, it is "fair, reasonable, and adequate". In exchange for settlement funds, all class members, even if they were unaware of the settlement, relinquish their claim against the defendant.

Under the proposed settlement terms, the three lawyers in the case would receive over $2 million (an hourly rate of $1000/hour) and the named plaintiffs would receive $5,000 apiece, while an additional $6 million would be given to several privacy groups under the cy-près doctrine in lieu of compensation to then remaining unnamed class action members, due to the cost of administering the payout to those estimated 129 million individuals and the low amount of compensation (an estimated four cents). The privacy groups that would receive some of the money included each of the three lawyers' alma maters and several groups that Google has supported. The district court judge in the case, Judge Edward Davlia, noted "the elephant in the room is that many of them are law schools that you attended. ... I’m disappointed that the usual suspects are still usual." Bloomberg News stated that Judge Davlia remarked that the lack of transparency in selecting the recipients of the money "raises a red flag" and "doesn’t pass the smell test", although it was nonetheless approved.

In response to the settlement, Ted Frank and Melissa Holyoak of the Competitive Enterprise Institute, two of the 129 million unnamed members of the class being represented in the case, intervened to challenge the settlement on the grounds that it violated a procedural rule that such cy-pres settlements be "fair, reasonable and adequate." Google labeled Frank as a "professional objector". The Ninth Circuit Court of Appeals upheld the use of cy-pres in this case, noting that otherwise the estimated 129 million web users that could theoretically receive damages from the suit would receive "a paltry 4 cents in recovery."

As Brian Miller of the Center for Individual Rights, in an opinion piece for Forbes, summarized the problem:

Since our justice system is adversarial, it works best when the parties vigorously represent their interests in court. But in large class actions, individuals lose their voice. The attorneys for both sides have an incentive to reach an agreement, even if it comes at the expense of the individuals who were actually harmed. As Judge Richard Posner once said in an opinion, 'The control of the class over its lawyers usually is attenuated, often to the point of nonexistence.' This typically results in settlements that maximize attorney’s fees. Any surplus is often awarded to third party charities rather than to the actual plaintiffs.

== Supreme Court appeal ==
Frank filed a petition of certiorari in the U.S. Supreme Court. The Center for Constitutional Jurisprudence, Cato Institute, Center for Individual Rights, and Attorney General of Arizona, in a brief joined by 15 other states, filed amicus curiae briefs urging the court to grant certiorari. The court granted certiorari on April 30, 2018. The Court gives the following as the question presented in this case:

Federal Rule of Civil Procedure 23(b)(3) permits representatives to maintain a class action where so doing "is superior to other available methods for fairly and efficiently adjudicating the controversy," and Rule 23(e)(2) requires that a settlement that binds class members must be 'fair, reasonable, and adequate.' In this case, the Ninth Circuit upheld approval of an $8.5 million settlement that disposed of absent class members' claims while providing them zero monetary relief. Breaking with decisions of the Third Circuit, Fifth Circuit, Seventh Circuit, and Eighth Circuit that require compensating class members before putting class action proceeds to other uses, the Ninth Circuit held that the settlement's award of all net proceeds to third-party organizations selected by the defendant and class counsel was a fair and adequate remedy under the trust-law doctrine of cy pres. The question presented is: Whether, or in what circumstances, a cy pres award of class action proceeds that provides no direct relief to class members supports class certification and comports with the requirement that a settlement binding class members must be 'fair, reasonable, and adequate.'

The Solicitor General filed an amicus brief in support of neither party arguing that, before reaching the merits on the question presented, there is "considerable doubt whether the Court has Article III jurisdiction to address that question, because plaintiffs’ standing in the district court depended on a theory of injury that this Court subsequently rejected in Spokeo, Inc. v. Robins, 136 S. Ct. 1540 (2016)" and that the court may wish to vacate and remand the case to address the issue of standing.

Oral arguments were heard on October 31, 2018, with Frank having been one of the few Supreme Court attorneys ever to argue his own case. The justices were divided along partisan lines based on observers' opinions, with the liberal justices supporting the cy pres approach used, while the conservative members felt the cy pres decision denied the class members their restitution and were critical of how much of the settlement went to legal fees. Writing for SCOTUSblog, Ronald Mann noted that at oral argument "all seemed to agree that the district court’s reasoning could not withstand scrutiny under Spokeo. The point of disagreement seemed to be whether there was any prospect that the plaintiffs could identify some new argument that would satisfy Spokeo at this late date."

The following week, the court ordered the parties and the Solicitor General "to file supplemental briefs addressing whether any named plaintiff has standing such that the federal courts have Article III jurisdiction over this dispute." Briefing will be completed by December 21.

The Court issued a per curiam decision on March 20, 2019, vacating the Ninth Circuit's decision and requesting continued review based on the Spokeo decision which had been brought up in the briefing stage of the case, in which questioned whether there was proper standing in this case. As the Spokeo question was not considered at the Ninth Circuit, the Supreme Court could not be the first court to consider that matter, and thus returned the case to the Ninth Circuit, expressing no view on the matter otherwise.
