= Envision EMI =

For profit, tuition-based education company

Envision EMI, LLC
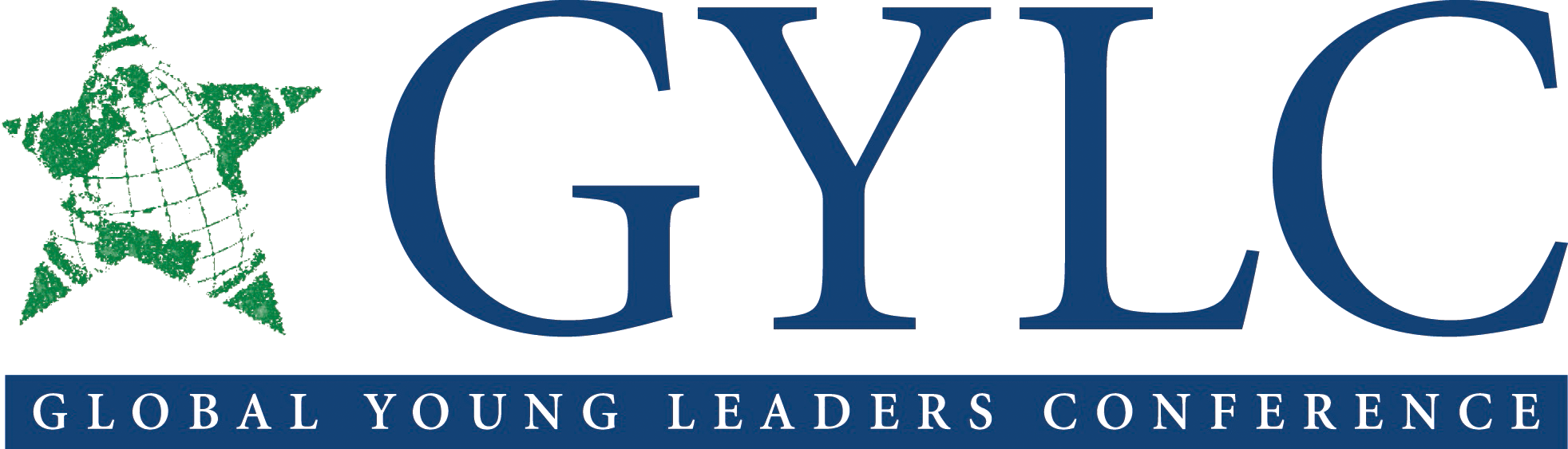
- Type: Private
- Founded: 1985 – current
- Founder: Barbara Harris; Richard Rossi
- Headquarters: Vienna, Virginia, USA
- Area served: Worldwide
- Subsidiaries: Explore STEM, National Young Leadership Forum, NYLF MED, NYLF Law, NYLF Engineering, Envision Game & Technology Academy, Advanced Emergency Medicine, Intensive Law & Trial, Pathways to STEM, International Scholar Laureate Program
- Website: envisionexperience.com

Envision EMI, LLC (Envision Experience) is a privately held, for-profit, tuition-based education company that creates, markets, and runs career exploration and leadership development programs for students in elementary school through college. The company manages twenty unique summer educational programs, including programs in Government and Leadership, Law, CSI, Medicine, Mass Media, Gaming and Technology, Engineering, National Security, Business Innovation, and Early STEM Exploration. Many of Envision's programs are held at university and college campuses. In addition, the company has collaborated with several national universities, including Stanford University for its Advanced Emergency Medicine, and Intensive Law & Trial programs, Rice University for the Rice University Aerospace & Aviation Academy, and George Mason University for its Game & Technology Academy.

The company is based in Vienna, Virginia and offers programs in a number of cities across the United States, as well as selected cities in China, Australia, South Africa and New Zealand. In 2012, Envision EMI merged with LeadAmerica and rebranded itself as Envision Experience. The company's current officers are Duncan Young, CEO, Don Neff, CFO, Andrew Potter, CAO, and Lauren Freyfield, CMO

Envision's programs have been accredited by the International Association for Continuing Education and Training (IACET), the Southern Association of Colleges and Schools, and the Commission on Accreditation and School Improvement (SACS CASI) an accrediting division of AdvancED.

== History ==
=== Founding and purpose ===
The company was originally founded as the Congressional Youth Leadership Council (CYLC) in 1985 by Barbara Harris and Richard Rossi. Prior to founding CYLC, Harris worked as both a classroom teacher and as a school administrator, and Rossi worked as a congressional staffer. The two met when Harris arranged a trip for her students to attend the second Presidential Inauguration of Ronald Reagan. The stated purpose of the company was to "create unique experiences that create a lifetime advantage to high-achievers." As of 2010, neither Harris nor Rossi were affiliated with the company.

=== Early history ===
After seven years of exclusively operating as the Congressional Youth Leadership Council (CYLC), Harris and Rossi incorporated the National Youth Leadership Forum with the goal of helping prepare high school students for college and career success. The first such forum, held in 1992, was the National Youth Leadership Forum (NYLF) on National Security. CYLC and NYLF both worked with National Capital Resources for curriculum development and delivery.

==== Growth of NYLF and CYLC ====
In 1993, NYLF added the forum on Medicine. Two years later, they would add the forum on Law & CSI.

In 1998, National Capital Resources was renamed as Envision EMI, and one year later, CYLC held its first international program, the Global Young Leaders Conference (GYLC). By 2003, CYLC and NYLF had added the International Scholar Laureate Program for college-aged students and the Junior National Young Leaders Conference (JrNYLC) for middle school students. As of 2006, the combined companies had over 200 staff members and annual revenues of over US$75 million, with over 47,000 students from fourth grade through college attended Envision programs around the world.

In 2007, Envision EMI acquired the assets of the Congressional Youth Leadership Conference and the National Youth Leadership Forum. According to the 2008 IRS filing for one of its subsidiary programs, the Congressional Youth Leadership Council, "all full-time staff working on the account of CYLC are employees of Envision EMI LLC." Envision EMI formerly operated some of its programs on behalf of non-profit entities that it had an exclusive marketing relationship with, including the Congressional Youth Leadership Council and the National Youth Leadership Forum, which Envision purchased in November 2007. Envision acquired the assets of the Congressional Youth Leadership Council, including its name and the rights to run all of the programs.

By 2009, the company was hosting more than 56,000 students in 273 conferences in the United States, China, and Australia focusing on career education and qualities of leadership. The week-long programs ranged from $1,440 to more than $3,060. Students were encouraged to raise money to help fund the trip. The programs are marketed as conferences that help scholars develop their leadership and educational skills. The company strives through its marketing efforts to reach students it describes as high-achievers.

=== Recent history ===
In October 2011, substantially all the assets of Envision EMI, LLC were acquired by Leadership Platform Acquisition Corporation (LPAC), an newly formed affiliate of Gryphon Investors, which describes itself as "a highly respected San Francisco based private equity firm with a strong commitment to the field of education."

In June 2012, the company hired John B. Richards, the former head of Starbucks' North American operations with a marketing background in the hospitality industry, as its new CEO. In August 2012, the company merged with LeadAmerica, a company that offered similar services. In August, 2013, the company rebranded itself as Envision Experience.

== Programs worldwide ==
As of the summer of 2018, the company offered 17 different career, leadership, and technology programs at 35 different locations across the United States and world, including programs in China, Australia, South Africa, and New Zealand. Envision offers career exploration programs in the following fields: Medicine, Law, Engineering, Business, National Security, and Game Design. The company also offers high school and middle school leadership programs, as well as early STEM exploration for middle and elementary school students. Additionally, every four years, coinciding with the U.S. presidential inauguration, the conducts a Presidential Inauguration Leadership Summit. Prior to the 2017 Summit, the company partnered with Discovery Education in a program through which high school students interviewed and reported on candidates for the 2016 U.S. presidential election. Previously, in 2009, Envision EMI hosted more than 56,000 students in 273 conferences, more students than attended the programs of the company's three closest competitors combined, and it planned to offer 310 conferences in 2010. Most of the programs were attended by 150 to 400 students.

== Programs by grade level ==
Envision programs are offered students as young as third grade and as old as rising college seniors, with middle and elementary school programs focusing on STEM exploration and leadership development and high school programs focusing more on career exploration.

=== Elementary school programs ===
==== National Youth Leadership Forum: Pathways to STEM ====
A six-day program for students in grades 3 - 5 that introduces them STEM applications and leadership skills. Students also participate in an emergency medicine simulation that was created in collaboration with Dr. Paul Auerbach, a professor at Stanford Medicine. For the summer of 2019, the program will be held at over 18 locations across the United States.

=== Middle school programs ===
==== National Youth Leadership Forum: Explore STEM ====
A six-day program for students in grade 6 - 8 that allows them to explore careers in Medicine, Engineering, Robotics, and Forensic Science. The theme of the program is "Mission to Mars." During the program, students hear from a former NASA astronaut. Previous speakers include Dr. Leroy Chiao, Nicole Stott, Dr. Mary Ellen Webber, and Dr. Don Thomas. For 2019, the program will be held at eleven location across the United States, including Emory University, Villanova University, and Wake Forest University.

==== Junior National Young Leaders Conference ====
A six-day program for students in grade 5 - 8. Held in Washington, DC, students study leadership, visit historical monuments, and create their own service organization. Students also hear from NCAA wrestling champion and author Anthony Robles.

==== Global Young Leaders Conference ====
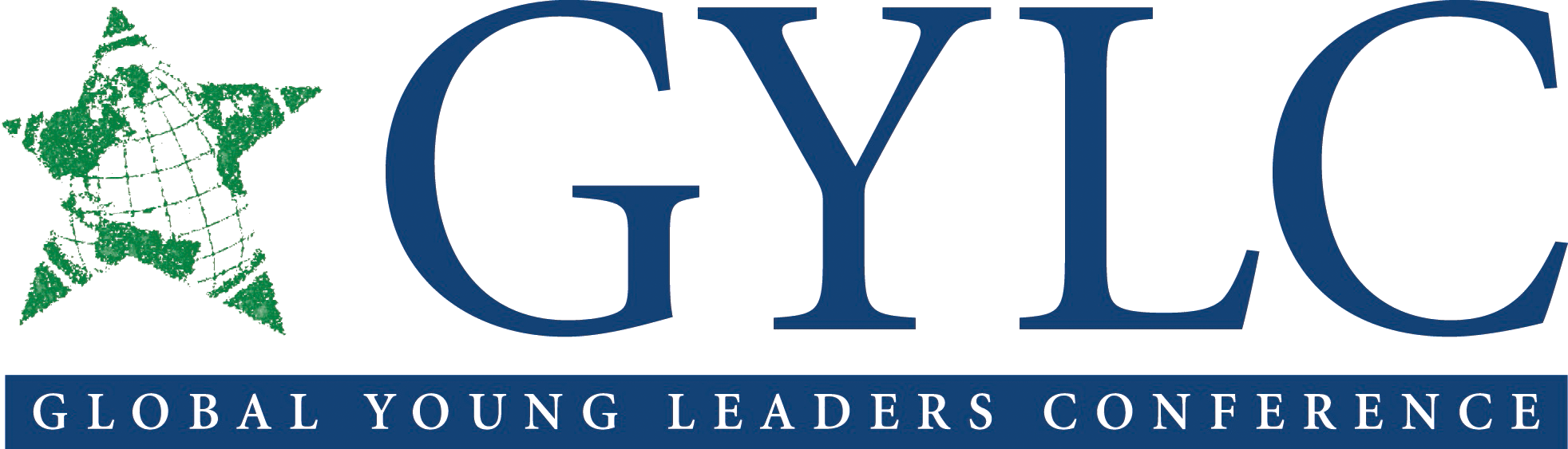
Logo of the Global Young Leaders Conference

The Global Young Leaders Conference is an annual two-week meeting of young people from around the world who are viewed as future leaders. The aim of the conference is to develop appropriate leadership qualities in a global context.

The core program of the conference consists of three components ("three S"):

- Speaker events: Here the participants get to know influential leaders from politics, business and NGOs. This usually takes the form of a presentation, panel discussion and subsequent question and answer session.
- Sightseeing: The participants visit government institutions, embassies and international organizations, but also cultural sights and educational institutions.
- Simulation: Within the entire core program, participants simulate the two most important organs of the United Nations, similar to MUN. In the first simulation, the UN Security Council has to work out a resolution on an international conflict, while in the final Global Summit all groups of countries come together and together as the UN General Assembly discuss a wide variety of resolutions on global problems that were previously worked out by various commissions.

During the rest of the time, topics are prepared and discussed in so-called Leadership Group Meetings (LGM). Most of the country group work takes place here. Each LGM group represents a particular country in the simulations and is each supervised by a Faculty Advisor (FA). The LGMs are also intended to introduce each other to the different cultures and origins of the scholars.

In addition to the core program, there is the option of enrolling for a pre-program as well as a so-called cultural add-on. While the pre-program is intended to prepare for the main program and bring the participants closer together, the cultural add-on is a relaxed follow-up program that consists of visiting the sights of the conference location.

=== High school programs ===
==== National Youth Leadership Forum: Medicine ====
A nine-day program for students in grades 9 -11 who are interested in exploring careers in medicine. For 2019, the program will be held at nine college campuses, including the University of California - Berkeley, Emory University, Washington University in St. Louis, and the University of California - Los Angeles.

==== National Youth Leadership Forum: Advanced Medicine & Health Care ====
A ten-day program for students in grades 9 - 11, where students stay on the campus of Johns Hopkins University and participate in workshops and simulations that expose them to careers in medicine and health care, including a virtual reality surgery.

==== Advanced Emergency Medicine ====
A ten-day program for students in grades 9 -12 who are interested in a career in emergency medicine. The program is held on the campus of Stanford University and conducted in collaboration with Stanford Medicine. Students who attend receive instruction from Stanford Medicine faculty.

==== Rice University Aerospace & Aviation Academy ====
A twelve-day program for students in grades 9 -12 who are interested in a careers in Aerospace or Aviation. During the program, students who attend receive instruction from Rice University faculty and hear from experts in the aerospace and aviation fields, including former NASA astronaut Leroy Chiao.

==== National Youth Leadership Forum: Business Innovation ====
A six-day program for students in grades 9 - 12 who are interested in pursuing a career in business/entrepreneurship. Previously held on multiple campus locations, the 2019 program is held on the campus of Yale University.

==== National Youth Leadership Forum: National Security ====
An 8-day program for students in grades 9-12 who are interested in careers in diplomacy, intelligence, or defense. During the program, students stay on the campus of Georgetown University and visit embassies and military sites in and around the Washington, DC area.

==== National Youth Leadership Forum: Law & CSI ====
A six-day program for students in grades 9 - 11 who are interested in exploring careers in either law or forensic science. Held in the Washington, DC area, students have the option of either focusing on law or forensic science.

==== National Youth Leadership Forum: Engineering ====
An eight-day program for students in grades 9 - 11 who are interested in exploring careers in engineering. For 2019, the program will be held at the University of California, Berkeley and Georgia Tech.

==== Intensive Law & Trial ====
A ten-day program for students in grades 9 - 12 who are interested in a career in law. Held in collaboration with Stanford Law School, students stay on the Stanford University campus and receive instruction from Stanford Law professors.

==== Global Young Leaders Conference ====
A ten-day program for students in grades 9 - 12 who are interested in learning about diplomacy and leadership. Attracting attendees from all over the world, the program begins in Washington, DC and concludes in New York, NY.

==== Game & Technology Academy ====
A thirteen-day program for students in grades 9 - 12 who are interested in a career in game design. Held on the campus of George Mason University, the program allows students to select one of three unique tracks and includes a visit to the Virginia Serious Game Institute.

== Program speakers ==
During Envision programs, students are given the opportunity to learn and exchange ideas with business leaders, politicians, lobbyists, journalists, diplomats and academics. Previous Envision speakers include:

- General Colin Powell
- Malala Yousafzai
- Abby Wambach
- Spike Lee
- Shawn Fanning
- Guy Kawasaki

== Student selection ==
Students can be nominated or apply to participate in Envision's programs. Teachers, guidance counselors, youth organization advisers, participating institutions, and alumni can nominate students. Students can also apply to attend the programs here "...during which you will write two short essays and provide the name of a mentor – teacher, guidance counselor, coach, etc. – who can speak to your achievements and maturity, and who may be contacted to offer supporting information for your application.” The company seeks attendees who have a 3.0 or higher GPA, demonstrated leadership potential through extracurricular activities, and provide two short, written essays on their career goals. It also accepts applications from students with lower GPAs if they provide a teacher recommendation attesting to the student's interest in the conference area and a statement that the student's GPA does not reflect their full potential.

== Recognition ==
In 1999, 2003, and in November 2007, Envision EMI was cited in "Great Places to Work: Where to Launch a Career" by The Washingtonian Magazine.

== College credits ==
The faculty at George Mason University has approved several Envision programs for elective college credit in "Special Topics in Leadership.". These programs are the NYLF Forum on National Security, the National Young Leaders Conference, the National Youth Leadership Forum on Medicine, the National Youth Leadership Forum on Law and CSI, and the Global Young Leaders Conference. Participating students have the opportunity to earn one or two college credits, depending upon the length of the program, and credits are generally transferable to other 4-year colleges or universities. Students are evaluated for "active participation in simulations, contributions to discussions and demonstration of leadership and critical thinking skills in group and individual settings."

George Mason University notes that "it is unlikely that this type of credit will have a significant bearing on the college admissions process. When given the opportunity, we encourage students to think about how they can present these experiences in the application process as an example of their leadership potential." Academic programs offering college credit help save on undergraduate tuition, in addition to allowing students to explore specialized career paths and interests while offering "invaluable opportunities to take advanced courses and make use of resources not available in most high schools".

== Criticism ==
=== Recruitment practices ===
The company markets its programs to what it describes as "high achievers" and "an elite group of outstanding young people" which it identifies via recommendations and mass mailings. In 2009, more than 287,000 teachers nominated students to participate in an Envision EMI program. Students are nominated to attend the National Youth Leadership Forum by "teachers and alumni of previous conferences, and it culls names from mailing lists, for which the Congressional Youth Leadership Council paid $263,000 in 2006."

In the past, critics have accused the company of recruiting students by claiming that attendance is selective when the company actually markets its programs to tens of thousands of youth. In 2009, when Envision was still under the direction of Richard Rossi, the company's co-founder and the current President and Executive Director of the National Leadership Academies, the company attracted over 15,000 youth to events related to President Barack Obama's inauguration but was unable to fulfill the promises it made in its promotional materials. It settled a lawsuit, promising to pay out up to $17 million in vouchers to event attendees.

In 2008, some program materials stated that a minimum 3.5 grade point average (GPA) was required. Educators who nominate students are now told to use their own discretion. Teachers who nominate students to attend the company's programs say they consider a student's grades, behavior and participation in class, interactions with other students, and ability to learn. The nomination form does not ask for GPA. levels or educational achievement, simply asking only for the student's name, address, school year and sex.

Many high school students believe that attending one of Envisions' conferences is an honor and that their participation will positively affect their chances for college admission. CollegeConfidential.com, written by professional college admission counselors, reports that "Too many students are invited to take part to make this a truly selective organization, and so many college candidates do take part—especially those from the more well-heeled families—that college-admission officials usually just yawn when they spot an Envision program on an application."

Among college students, Susan Garrity Ardizzoni, Director of Undergraduate Admissions at Tufts University, reported that some students who receive invitations are not what she would consider "leadership material." Patrick O'Connor, the director of college counseling at the Roeper School for gifted students in Birmingham, Michigan, reported that he is "happy to nominate whoever wants to go."

=== 2009 inaugural conference criticism and legal action ===
In January 2009, Envision EMI was criticized for its handling of their Presidential Youth Inaugural Conferences that offered 15,000 youths the opportunity to attend exclusive events in Washington, D.C. Participants received a letter congratulating them on being "accepted to be among the thousands of students" to "witness first-hand the Inauguration of the 44th President of the United States.

Some students who had attended prior Envision events were surprised by the number of participants. One alumni of prior Envision conferences said she did not expect to be among 5,000 university students and 10,000 middle school and high school students at the conference. Prior conferences she had attended had around 200 to 400 students. Envision did not tell participants the actual number of attendees until they arrived. A former employee of Envision, Angie Peltzer, returned as a faculty adviser during the Presidential Youth Inaugural Conferences and said she believed the company was unprepared to handle the number of students. "It's hard to do 15,000 people when you've only done 500 before," Peltzer said. Another student attendee said the invitation gave her the impression "that there would be less people and it would be more intimate." She was surprised by the numbers who attended.

The program web site stated that the conference included "exclusive and private inaugural events and activities... as well as public ceremonial events, such as the official swearing-in ceremony and the inaugural parade."

Parents began to file complaints with the company. As a result, the company pledged an independent review headed by Benjamin R. Civiletti, the Carter administration attorney general, and set aside US$1 million for restitution. The company acknowledged there were issues: "While the vast majority of scholars who attended our presidential inaugural programs had a positive experience, we acknowledge that some of them have stated that they did not and this is unacceptable to us.... We are urgently working to address each and every concern and to respond to the families' inquiries as quickly as possible."

==== Lawsuit filed ====
On May 13, 2009, the law firms Hausfeld LLP and DiMuroGinsberg PC filed a class action lawsuit, Radosti v. Envision EMI, LLC. The plaintiffs filed suit against Envision and CYLC citing breach of contract, negligent misrepresentation, and violations of state consumer protection laws. According to the lawsuit, delegates were told they would attend a "Black Tie Gala", when the actual dress code was "professional business attire (suits)". The suit alleges, that "instead of the promised official inaugural ball, the students were taken to a "glorified prom"." Richard Rossi, a co-founder of Envision, told The New York Times in April 2009 that the logistical challenges during the inauguration were overwhelming. "We were operating in almost a war zone, literally a presidential state of emergency", Mr. Rossi said. "There were a lot of things going on that were inconveniencing even V.I.P.'s."

==== Settlement announced ====
On June 10, 2010, the law firm announced a settlement that provided up to US$17 million in tuition vouchers to members of the class action suit. The vouchers provide anyone who attended any of the inaugural programs with two, fully transferable vouchers worth US$625 (totaling US$1,250). The voucher can be redeemed until 2018 in payment as tuition for any future Envision program. Class members may only transfer the vouchers to individuals who meet Envision's academic qualifications, including a demonstrated grade point average of 3.5 or higher.

The judge who approved the settlement noted that the cy pres fund established by the settlement agreement—if properly administered—will ensure that Envision substantially disgorges the profits from its alleged misconduct. The vouchers are worth approximately 50% of the tuition cost for the Presidential Inaugural conference. To provide a marketplace for the transferable vouchers, Envision agreed to maintain a web page describing how the vouchers can be transferred and redeemed. If Envision fails to distribute vouchers totaling at least US$8,000,000, it agreed to establish a Class Settlement Scholarship Fund that may be used to provide partial or total scholarships to "academically qualified applicants." The Fund may also distribute an additional 5% of scholarships to other youth organizations to give to their members so they may attend Envision programs. As of March 2015, the voucher web site page was no longer available.

==== Settlement criticism ====
In an amicus curiae brief filed with the United States Supreme Court, Theodore H. Frank of the public-interest law firm Center for Class Action Fairness stated that there is a likelihood that "class members will not be able to use their coupons to attend the conference of their choice, given that only 10% of seats at any given conference will be allowed to redeem coupons." He noted that the court approved the settlement over the objection of 22 state attorneys general. He also wrote that class members are forced to help Envision EMI stay in business and are compelled to deal with the same firm that failed to deliver the initial conference for which they paid more than $2,300 to attend.

Honorary Board of Congressional Advisors

In August of 2011, Representative Gary L. Ackerman (D-NY) led an effort to expose to members of Congress the Congressional Youth Leadership Council's transition to for-profit status and continued use of its "Honorary Board of Congressional Advisors" to advertise its product. The "Board," which held no meetings or had any formal duties, was used to establish purported credibility of the program. As a result of Ackerman's efforts to inform members of Congress of CYLC's tactics and conversion to for-profit status, dozens of Representatives withdrew their names and ultimately the "board" was disbanded.
