= CYLC =

CYLC may stand for:

- Congressional Youth Leadership Council, a United States-based youth organization
- Kimmirut Airport Canada (ICAO airport code)
- Communist Youth League of China
