= The Libertarian Mind =

2015 nonfiction book by David Boaz

The Libertarian Mind: A Manifesto for Freedom
- First edition
- Author: David Boaz
- Publisher: Simon & Schuster
- Publication date: February 10, 2015
- Pages: 417
- ISBN: 9781476752846 (Hardcover)

The Libertarian Mind: A Manifesto for Freedom is a 2015 nonfiction book by David Boaz, who was the executive vice president of the Cato Institute. An update of his 1997 manifesto Libertarianism: A Primer, the book explores libertarianism and advocates for increased economic and personal freedoms.
