= Arthur Alan Wolk =

American attorney and author (born 1943)

- Born: October 25, 1943 (age 82); Philadelphia, Pennsylvania
- Education: Temple University, B.S., 1965; Temple University School of Law, J.D., 1968
- Occupation: Attorney/Author/Lecturer
- Known for: Aviation Law and Air Safety
- Website: airlaw.com

Arthur Alan Wolk (born October 25, 1943) is an American attorney and author. He is the founding partner of The Wolk Law Firm in Philadelphia, Pennsylvania, which specializes in aviation law and air crash litigation for plaintiffs.

Wolk is an author, editor and lecturer on aviation law and air safety with articles published by The Aviation Consumer, Aviation Safety and other publications and has appeared on ABC Evening News, CBS Evening News, CNBC, and CNN Larry King Live.

Wolk is admitted to practice law in Pennsylvania. He received his B.S. degree cum laude from Temple University in 1965, and his J.D. degree from Temple University School of Law in 1968.

== Notable cases ==
Wolk reports that he represented victims in several major airline disasters. Some of the most notable air crash cases Wolk has had involvement in include:

- USAir 427, Aliquippa, PA., Pittsburgh, Boeing 737. The flight crashed on September 8, 1994, killing everyone on board. Wolk speculated the cause of the crash was rudder failure and appeared the next day on ABC Evening News for Friday September 9, 1994 Peter Jennings reporter, in this program Wolk offered views on the cause of the crash. Wolk published his opinion that rudder failure was the likely cause of USAir 427 crash in the Pennsylvania Law Weekly, October 10, 1994. On October 25 he appeared on CBS Evening News with Reporter Dan Rather October 25, 1994, and offered comments about possible rudder failure. After the longest investigation in aviation history, more than four and a half years later, the National Transportation Safety Board concluded the probable cause was rudder failure. Wolk was the plaintiffs attorney in Hamley vs. The Boeing Corporation and won the case establishing that it was the rudder actuator that failed.
- In 2010, Wolk won a $89 million jury award ($24.7 million in compensatory damages and $64 million in punitive damages) in Pridgen v. Avco Corp. That case involved a 1999 airplane crash caused by a faulty carburetor. The defendants argued that the lawsuit was barred by the General Aviation Revitalization Act of 1994, as the suit was filed more than 18 years after the component was manufactured. However, Wolk argued that suit should go forward because the manufacturer had intentionally misrepresented information to the Federal Aviation Administration.
- Comair Flight 3272, Monroe, MI, (Detroit), Embraer EMB 120 Brasilia; Swissair 111, Peggy's Cove, Nova Scotia, McDonnell Douglas MD-11; EgyptAir 990, near Nantucket, MA, Boeing 767; and Alaska Airlines Flight 261, Port Mugu, CA, McDonnell Douglas MD-80.

== Suits against AVWeb.com and others ==
In 2001, Wolk won a $480 million verdict against Cessna which drew criticism from the AVWeb.com website. In 2002, Wolk sued the website and four people who posted comments there. The website and comment submitters then settled the suit with a payment to charity and published apologies. This settlement in turn drew critical coverage from the Overlawyered.com weblog. Ted Frank then posted a criticism of Wolk on Overlawyered.com for his 2007 lawsuit against Teledyne. In 2009, Wolk sued Overlawyered editor Walter Olson, Frank, and Overlawyered blogger David Nieporent, claiming that the blog libeled him. According to the complaint, Wolk did not discover the article until April 2009. In 2010, Judge Mary A. McLaughlin of the United States District Court for the Eastern District of Pennsylvania dismissed the lawsuit for failure to comply with the one-year statute of limitations on the grounds that a blog is mass media and the statute of limitations runs from the date of publication. Wolk has appealed the court's decision.

On July 26, 2011, Wolk filed a new lawsuit against 42 defendants, including the defendants from his original libel suit, the lawyers who represented those defendants in the suit, The Reason Foundation, "INTERNET BLOGGER '/b/'", and the Manhattan Institute, alleging over 20 causes of action. In the lawsuit, Wolk admitted that he had hired an organization to "place truthful, favorable information" about him on Wikipedia. Writing for Public Citizen, Paul Levy criticized the lawsuit; Public Citizen's blog reports that Wolk has since filed suit against both Levy and Public Citizen. Wolk has also threatened to sue technology blog TechDirt over their reporting of the suit.

== Personal aviation experience ==
Wolk has been a pilot for more than 30 years and holds an Airline Transport Pilot License (ATP) certificate for multi-engine land and sea aircraft. Wolk owned a restored Grumman F9F Panther jet fighter that he has flown in air shows throughout the country; performing low level aerobatics and formation flights.

In November 1996, Wolk broke his arm and back when he crashed his F9F Panther. He later sued the National Transportation Safety Board over its report of the crash. The lawsuit, filed in U.S. District Court in 2000, also names Honeywell International Inc. and Allied Signal Inc. as defendants, claiming they gave false information to the NTSB to avoid liability. The suit says the NTSB report contained extensive errors, including a statement that Wolk was not qualified to fly the plane.

In 2002, the District Court judge dismissed Wolk's suit against the NTSB and other defendants in its entirety. Wolk then appealed unsuccessfully to the U.S. Circuit Court for the Third Circuit. In this decision, United States Circuit Judge Joseph F. Weis, Jr. writes: "We have carefully reviewed the District Court's opinion and, despite the excellent brief and oral argument on appeal by plaintiff, do not find reversible error." Wolk then sought a Supreme Court review of the decision, but the Supreme Court refused to hear the case. Wolk represented himself in the lawsuit.
