= Fred L. Smith (political writer) =

American political writer (1940–2024)

Fred L. Smith Jr.
- Born: December 26, 1940; Alabama, U.S.
- Died: November 23, 2024 (aged 83); Maryland, U.S.
- Education: Tulane University
- Occupations: Economist, political writer
- Spouse: Fran Smith

Fred L. Smith Jr. (December 26, 1940 – November 23, 2024) was an American economist and political writer. He was the founder and president of the Competitive Enterprise Institute, a Washington, D.C.–based nonprofit libertarian think tank. He wrote on topics such as antitrust law, environmental regulation, and the economic impacts of global warming.

== Early life ==
Smith was born in Alabama on December 26, 1940. He was raised in Slidell, Louisiana. He held a B.S. degree in theoretical mathematics and political science from Tulane University where he earned the Arts and Sciences "Dean's Medal" (Tulane's highest academic award) and was elected to Phi Beta Kappa.

== Career ==
Smith founded the Competitive Enterprise Institute in 1984. In 2003, Smith lobbied the Secretary of the Treasury against a proposal that would require banks to report interest earned by non-resident aliens.

Smith appeared on Crossfire in 2006 and stated: "We know that there are these elaborate computer models that have never been right before, may be right this time, that suggest climate changes, possibly good, possibly bad. Most of the indications right now are it looks pretty good. Warmer winters, warmer nights, no effects during the day because of clouding, sounds to me like we’re moving to a more benign planet, more rain, richer, easier productivity to agriculture.". Smith defended contributions of companies such as ExxonMobil to groups skeptical of climate change, explaining that support for such organizations can be expected to rise as public interest in global warming issues increases, saying, "Firefighters' budgets go up when fires go up."

== Personal life and death ==
Smith was married to and is survived by Fran Smith, an adjunct scholar at CEI who also serves on its board of directors.

Smith died at home in Maryland, on November 23, 2024, at the age of 83.

== Bibliography ==
=== Volume contributor ===
- Global Warming and Other Eco-Myths
- True State of the Planet
- Corporate Aftershock: The Public Policy Lessons from the Collapse of Enron and Other Major Corporations
- Solutions for an Environment in Peril
- Market Liberalism: A Paradigm for the 21st Century
- Assessing the Reagan Years
- Smith Jr, Fred L.; Cox, Braden (2008). "Airline Deregulation". In David R. Henderson (ed.). Concise Encyclopedia of Economics (2nd ed.). Indianapolis: Library of Economics and Liberty. pp. 6–10. ISBN 978-0865976658. OCLC 237794267.
