= Cato Journal =

- Discipline: Public policy, political science
- Language: English
- Edited by: James A. Dorn

Publication details
- History: 1981–2021
- Publisher: Cato Institute (United States)
- Frequency: Triannual

Standard abbreviations
- ISO 4: Cato J.

Indexing
- ISSN: 0273-3072
- LCCN: 81642699
- OCLC no.: 637792412

Links
- Journal homepage; Online archive

The Cato Journal was a triannual peer-reviewed academic journal that covered public policy from an Austro-libertarian point of view. It was established in 1981 and published by the Cato Institute. It published articles discussing politics and economy. The journal was a "free-market, public policy journal ... for scholars concerned with questions of public policy, yet it is written and edited to be accessible to the interested lay reader". The final editor-in-chief was James A. Dorn. The final issue was released in 2021.

== History ==
The journal was established in 1981, when two issues were published. The frequency of publication has been triannual since 1982, with the exception of volume 15 for 1995. The Fall 2001 issue of the Cato Journal describes itself as "An interdisciplinary journal of public policy analysis" and contains articles by Alan Greenspan, Thomas M. Humphrey, Charles I.Plosser, Manuel H. Johnson, William A. Niskanen, Robert D. McTeer, Kevin Dowd, and Alan Reynolds, among others. In 2004/2005, the grouping together of issues into volumes switched from a Spring-Fall-Winter grouping to a Winter-Spring-Fall grouping, thereby synchronizing it with the calendar year. In Fall 2021, the Cato Journal released its final issue: Vol. 41, No. 3.

== See also ==
- Quarterly Journal of Austrian Economics
- The Independent Review
- Cato Unbound
- Regulation (magazine)
