= Warren T. Brookes =

American journalist (1929–1991)

- Born: 1929
- Died: December 28, 1991 (aged 62); Lovettsville, Virginia, US
- Education: Harvard University
- Occupation: Journalist
- Spouse: Jane Schwartz Brookes

Warren T. Brookes (1929 – December 28, 1991) was a journalist with the Boston Herald and the Detroit News and a nationally syndicated columnist known for his conservative political and economic views.

== Biography ==
Brookes graduated in 1952 from Harvard University with honors in economics and was thereafter employed by the Kimberly-Clark Corporation. In 1975, he joined the Boston Herald; a decade later he joined the editorial page staff of the Detroit News. His column, written from Washington, D.C., appeared in sixty newspaper on Mondays and Thursdays. He frequently challenged liberal economic and environmental ideas.

The Competitive Enterprise Institute, shortly before his passing, established the Warren T. Brookes Journalism Fellowship to identify and train journalists who wish to improve their knowledge of environmental issues and free market economics. The American Legislative Exchange Council (ALEC) presents the annual Warren Brookes Award for Excellence in Journalism.

Brookes was posthumously awarded the 1992 Gerald Loeb Award for Commentary.

== Books ==
- The Economy in Mind, Universe Pub, 1984
