= David Boaz =

American libertarian author and editor (1953–2024)

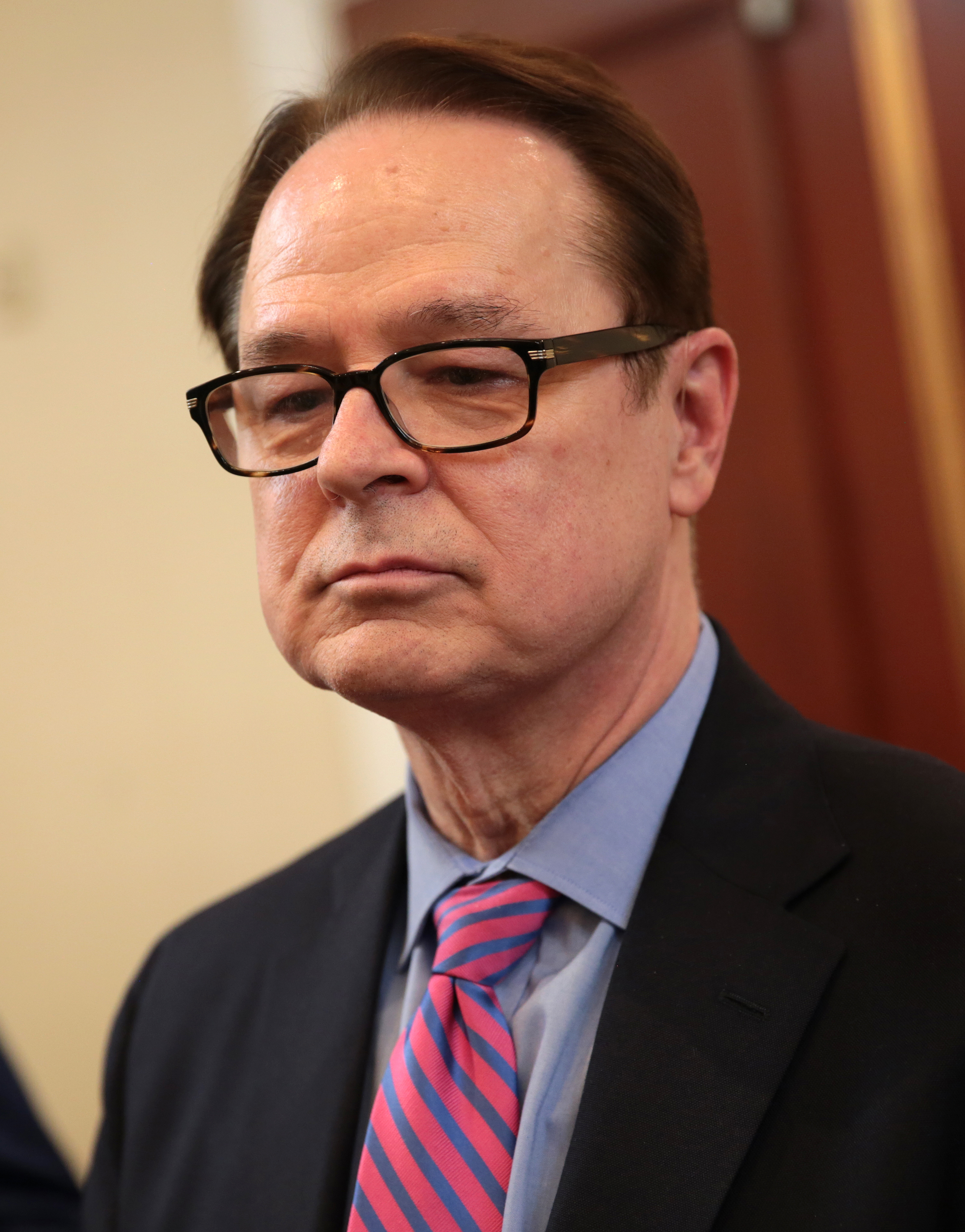
- Boaz in 2018
- Born: David Douglas Boaz; August 29, 1953; Mayfield, Kentucky, U.S.
- Died: June 7, 2024 (aged 70); Arlington County, Virginia, U.S.
- Education: Vanderbilt University (BA)
- Occupations: Writer; editor
- Partner: Steve Miller
- Writing career
- Subject: Libertarianism in the United States

David Douglas Boaz (/ˈboʊz/; August 29, 1953 – June 7, 2024) was a libertarian author, philosopher and editor. He was a distinguished senior fellow and the executive vice president of the Cato Institute, an American libertarian think tank. Boaz was a prominent advocate for individual liberty, limited government, free markets, and non-interventionist foreign policy.

Boaz authored several works on libertarian philosophy, including Libertarianism: A Primer and The Libertarian Mind: A Manifesto for Freedom. He was an early proponent of civil liberties, marriage equality, drug policy reform, and school choice, contributing to the mainstream acceptance of these issues in public discourse. Boaz is regarded as a key figure in the development and promotion of modern libertarian thought.

== Early years and education ==
Boaz was born on August 29, 1953, in Mayfield, Kentucky. His father was a judge, and one of his uncles, through marriage, was Frank Stubblefield, who served as a Democratic member of the U.S. House of Representatives. Boaz studied history at Vanderbilt University from 1971 to 1975, and as a young man was involved with the Young Americans for Freedom and the College Republicans.

== Career ==
Boaz eventually parted with the conservative movement, and worked on Ed Clark's campaigns for governor of California in 1978 and for president in 1980. Around this time, he joined the Cato Institute.

He was the author of Libertarianism: A Primer, published in 1997 by the Free Press and described in the Los Angeles Times as "a well-researched manifesto of libertarian ideas." He was also the editor of The Libertarian Reader and co-editor of the Cato Handbook for Congress (2003) and the Cato Handbook on Policy (2005). He frequently discussed on national television and radio shows such topics as education choice, the growth of government, the ownership society, his support of drug legalization as a consequence of the individual right to self-determination, a non-interventionist foreign policy, and the rise of libertarianism. Boaz said his views were informed by classical liberalism and opposed to populism. He expressed skepticism of party politics and did not join the Libertarian Party.

His articles were also published in The Wall Street Journal, The Washington Post, Los Angeles Times, National Review, and Slate. He appeared on ABC's Politically Incorrect, CNN's Crossfire, NPR's Talk of the Nation and All Things Considered, Fox News Channel, BBC, Voice of America and Radio Free Europe. A graduate of Vanderbilt University, he was once the editor of The New Guard magazine and was executive director of the Council for a Competitive Economy prior to joining Cato. In 2022, he retired as executive vice president of Cato and was named a distinguished senior fellow. He continued to write and appear on television until shortly before his death.

== Personal life and death ==
Boaz, who was openly gay, was with his partner, Steve Miller, for over 30 years. He was a teetotaler.

Boaz died from esophageal cancer at his home in Arlington County, Virginia, on June 7, 2024, at the age of 70.

== Books ==
- Market Liberalism: A Paradigm for the 21st Century, Editor with Edward H. Crane, 1993. ISBN 9780932790972. OCLC 27267709
- Libertarianism: A Primer, Free Press 1997. ISBN 9780684831985. OCLC 35658010
- The Libertarian Reader, Editor, Free Press 1997. ISBN 9780684832005. OCLC 35808396
- The Politics of Freedom: Taking on The Left, The Right and Threats to Our Liberties, 2008. ISBN 9781933995144. OCLC 254175718
- The Libertarian Vote: Swing Voters, Tea Parties, and the Fiscally Conservative, Socially Liberal Center, with David Kirby and Emily Ekins, 2012. ISBN 9781938048746
- The Libertarian Mind: A Manifesto for Freedom, Simon & Schuster, 2015. ISBN 9781476752846
