= Alan Reynolds (economist) =

American economist (born 1942)

Alan Anthony Reynolds (born 1942) is an American economist, author, and researcher whose work has influenced debates on tax policy, economic growth, and public policy in the United States and internationally. He is known for his writings on supply-side economics, fiscal policy, and the effects of taxation on economic incentives, as well as for his analyses of inflation, monetary policy, and government regulation.

== Early life and education ==
Reynolds was born at an Army base in Abilene, Texas, where his father, Alan D. Reynolds, served as a captain. After World War II, he grew up in California, first in Culver City, where his mother Rosine was a kindergarten teacher, and later in West Los Angeles, where his father worked as an actor in television and film.

He earned a Bachelor of Arts in Economics from the University of California, Los Angeles, in 1965. Following graduation, Reynolds married Karen Kane, and the couple moved to Sacramento, where Reynolds worked as a J.C. Penney store manager while taking graduate courses in economics at California State University. By 1971, he began dedicating weekends to writing on economic issues, marking the start of his professional engagement with public policy and economic commentary.

== Career ==
=== Early Career and Writing ===
Reynolds’ first published article appeared in Reason magazine in July 1971, defending the economist Milton Friedman against a critic. He maintained a close relationship with Friedman, who provided guidance on his early work. Later that year, his article “The Case Against Wage and Price Controls” appeared as a cover story in National Review. The magazine’s founding editor, William F. Buckley Jr., subsequently hired Reynolds as an associate editor.

During the 1970s, Reynolds contributed to shaping conservative economic thought, particularly in the areas of taxation and regulatory policy. His early writings warned of the consequences of price controls and rising reliance on foreign oil, anticipating the oil shocks of 1973-1974 featuring articles in The Wall Street Journal, New York Times, and National Review highlighted his analysis of inflationary pressures and energy policy failures.

=== Contribution to Supply-Side Economics ===
Reynolds is widely credited with popularizing the term “supply-side economics” through discussions with Wall Street Journal editors Jude Wanniski and Robert Bartley in the mid-1970s. He emphasized the importance of low marginal tax rates on additional income to incentivize work, investment, and entrepreneurial activity. His research and writings contributed to the policy debates that shaped the Reagan administration’s tax reforms and economic policies.

=== Government and Advisory Roles ===
Reynolds served as an economic advisor to Ronald Reagan’s 1980 presidential campaign and participated in the administration’s Inflation Task Force. He was an early member of Reagan’s Office of Management and Budget (OMB) transition team in 1981, working alongside economists such as Larry Kudlow and Alan Greenspan. Although he declined permanent positions in government, Reynolds continued advising policymakers and legislators, including as research director for the National Commission on Tax Reform and Economic Growth chaired by Jack Kemp in 1995.

=== Academic and Professional Career ===
From 1977 to 1981, Reynolds served as vice president and chief domestic economist at the First National Bank of Chicago. He then joined the consulting firm Polyconomics as vice president and chief economist (1981–1990) and subsequently became director of economic research at the Hudson Institute (1991–1999). Since 2000, he has been a senior fellow at the Cato Institute and, from 2020, affiliated with The American Institute for Economic Research.

Reynolds has also contributed to numerous publications as a columnist or writer, including Reason, Forbes, and Creators Syndicate. His research has appeared in scholarly and professional journals such as The Cato Journal, Harvard Business Review, The Energy Journal, Regulation, and Orbis, as well as in volumes from the Federal Reserve Banks, OECD, and academic institutions.

=== Research and Publications ===
Reynolds’ research spans a range of topics, including the effects of taxation on economic growth, the role of marginal tax rates, fiscal policy, and international economic comparisons. His work on historical economic recoveries and global policy experiments has examined how tax cuts, tariff reductions, and regulatory reforms affect national prosperity.

He has also challenged commonly cited statistics on income inequality, notably the use of top-1% tax data to measure economic disparities, arguing for more accurate assessments of disposable income and wealth distribution. His major work on that and related issues was the book Income and Wealth. (2006).

== Media ==
Reynolds has appeared on television programs including Firing Line, The MacNeil-Lehrer NewsHour, and Wall Street Week with Louis Rukeyser, as well as on CNBC, Fox Business, and C-SPAN.

== Bibliography ==
=== Books and Book Chapters ===
- Reynolds, Alan (1979). "Can Government Stabilize the Economy". Champions of Freedom, The Ludwig von Mises Lecture Series. Hillsdale College Press. pp. 79–96.
- Reynolds, Alan (2025). "Managed Money". SSRN Electronic Journal. doi:10.2139/ssrn.5731562. ISSN 1556-5068.
- After Enron: Lessons for Public Policy (Chapter 3, "Political Responses to the Enron Scandal," and Chapter 17, "Compensation, Journalism, and Taxes")
- Income and Wealth (Greenwood Press, 2006) ISBN 0313336881

=== Articles and other contributions ===
- "What Do We Know About the Great Crash?", National Review (Sept 9, 1979)
- "National Prosperity is No Mystery", Orbis (Spring 1996)
- "Capital Gains Tax: Analysis of Reform Options for Australia", Australian Stock Exchange (July 1999)
- "Monetary Policy by Trial and Error," in The Supply-Side Revolution 20 Years Later, Joint Economic Committee, U.S. Congress (March 2000)
- "What Really Happened in 1981?", The Independent Journal (Fall 2000) (with Paul Craig Roberts)
- "The Conventional Hypothesis: Deficit Estimates, Savings Rates, Twin Deficits and Yield Curves", U.S. Treasury (2004)
- "The Top 1% of What?", The Wall Street Journal (December 15, 2006)
- "Income Inequality Claims Ring Hollow When Correctly Examined", Budget and Tax News (May 2007)
