= AEI Legal Center for the Public Interest =

American conservative think tank

AEI Legal Center for the Public Interest (LCPI) was formed when the National Legal Center for the Public Interest (NLCPI) was merged into the conservative think tank American Enterprise Institute (AEI) in September 2007. Its stated mission is to "foster knowledge about law and the administration of justice, especially with respect to individual rights, free enterprise, property ownership, limited government, and a fair and efficient judiciary. It has pursued its educational and intellectual missions through a publishing program, conferences, and the annual Gauer Distinguished Lecture in Law and Public Policy."

== History ==
The NLCPI was founded in 1975 with funding by J. Simon Fluor and interests controlled by Richard Mellon Scaife.

Publications included white papers, legal monographs, judicial and legislative watch reports, and the Public Interest Law Review. NLCPI also sponsored a legal intern program, in which interns performed research and assisted in drafting legal briefs.

Its longtime president was Ernest Hueter, who served in that capacity for 25 years, retiring in 2004.

Fred Fielding was the most recent chairman of the foundation. Other prominent members included Theodore Olson, Judge Kenneth Starr, Supreme Court Chief Justice John G. Roberts, Robert H. Bork, and Bruce Fein. Much of its funding came from corporate and conservative foundations, including the Carthage Foundation, the Sarah Scaife Foundation, the John M. Olin Foundation, the Lynde and Harry Bradley Foundation, the Alcoa Foundation and ExxonMobil. The Center has also been associated with several prominent Democrats, including Cliff Sloan, Walter Dellinger, Seth Waxman, Griffin Bell, and Robert Strauss.

NLPCI publications frequently supported tort reform, the corporate interest, and were critical of the "impossibilities" of the Americans With Disabilities Act. NLPCI also ran a "Federal judge identification program" that sought "to identify those who believe that the appropriate role of the judiciary is to interpret the law, not make it."

According to a 1990 column by David Margolick, the national legal affairs editor at The New York Times, "This is a group that has taken the famous dictum of Charles E. Wilson one step further. It is no longer only what's good for General Motors that is good for America, but what's good for Dow Chemical, Amway, Shell Oil, 3M and others represented on the legal center's board of directors."

== Merger with AEI ==
In September 2007, the NLC was merged into the conservative American Enterprise Institute to become the AEI Legal Center for the Public Interest, directed by AEI resident fellow Ted Frank. AEI's existing legal and constitutional studies program, Federalism Project, and Liability Project were subsumed into the AEI Legal Center.

== See also ==
- American Association for Justice
