= Overlawyered =

Tort reform law blog (1999–2020)

Overlawyered was a law blog on the subject of tort reform from 1999-2020 run by author Walter Olson. In 2008 it was described as "widely considered to be the oldest legal blog and is also one of the most popular", according to Law.com.

== Content ==
The subject of the site is alleged absurdities, excesses, and abuse of the American tort law system. Its regular readership includes thousands of lawyers in the United States, as well as physicians, and readers in other countries considering American-style tort systems.

On April 26, 2013, Olson announced the blog had affiliated itself with the Cato Institute, where he is a senior fellow.

== Dispute ==
In 2010, aviation tort lawyer Arthur Alan Wolk sued Overlawyered, Olson, and contributors Ted Frank and David Nieporent for libel over a post written by Frank. Judge Mary A. McLaughlin ruled that Overlawyered is a "mass medium" and dismissed the case because Wolk did not file within the one-year statute of limitations. Wolk appealed his loss. In 2011, Wolk and Overlawyered reached a settlement.

== Termination ==
The blog ceased to operate on May 31, 2020.
