= Gene Healy =

American journalist (born 1970)

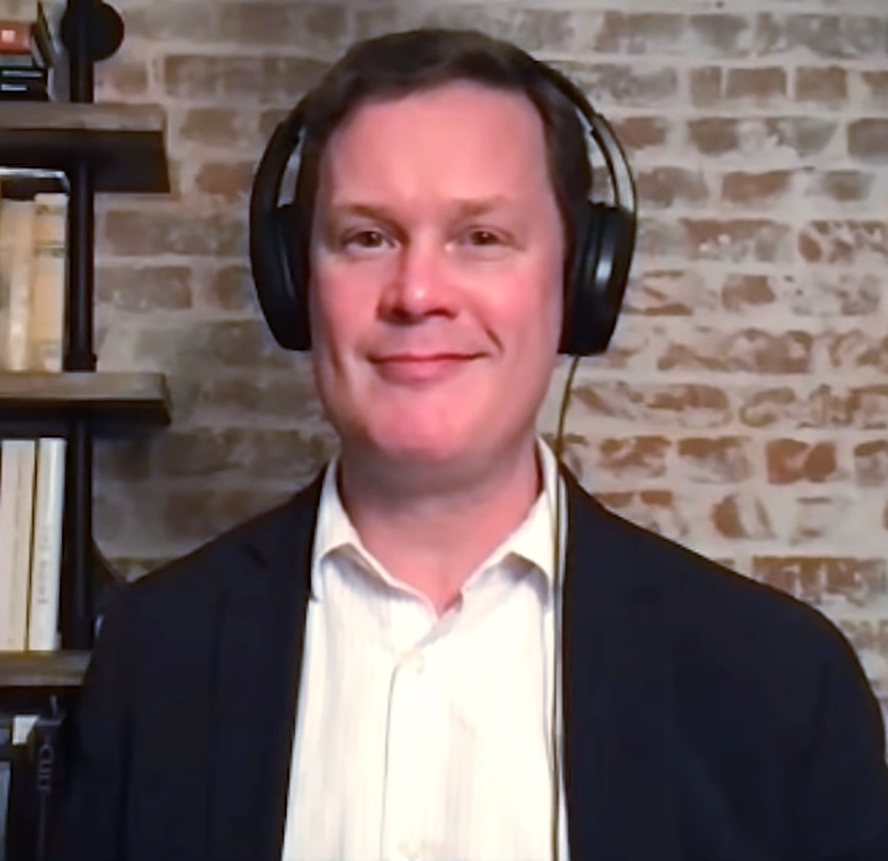
- Healy on Reason TV in 2021
- Born: November 16, 1970 (age 55); United States
- Education: Georgetown University; University of Chicago Law School
- Occupation: Journalist

Gene Healy (born November 16, 1970) is an American libertarian political pundit, journalist, and editor. He serves as senior vice president for policy at the Cato Institute and is a contributing editor to Liberty magazine.

== Education ==
Healy holds a B.A. from Georgetown University and a J.D. from the University of Chicago Law School.

== Career ==
Healy is editor of the 2004 book Go Directly to Jail: The Criminalization of Almost Everything. He is the author of The Cult of the Presidency: America's Dangerous Devotion to Executive Power (2008) and False Idol: Barack Obama and the Continuing Cult of the Presidency (2012). His research interests include executive power and the role of the presidency, federalism, and over-criminalization.

Healy has appeared on PBS's Newshour and has been a guest on NPR's Talk of the Nation. His writing has been published in major newspapers including the Los Angeles Times, the New York Times, the Chicago Tribune, and the Legal Times. He writes a weekly column for the Washington Examiner.

== Views ==
In 2011, Healy made the case that Ronald Reagan was neither a neoconservative, nor a libertarian. In 2013, Healy argued that wanting restraint in foreign policy is not "isolationist" and stated that isolationism "has always been a smear word designed to shut off debate. It was coined in the late 19th century by Alfred Thayer Mahan, 'an ardent militarist, who used the term to slur opponents of American imperialism.'" In 2014, Healy criticized Hillary Clinton's interventionist foreign policy, saying, "I think when you look at the totality of her record, it's very concerning. And if she realizes her lifelong dream in 2016 to become commander-in-chief of the U.S. Armed Forces, she won't have to urge anyone to bomb. She'll be able to give those orders herself."

== Bibliography ==
- Go Directly to Jail: The Criminalization of Almost Everything (editor) (2004) ISBN 978-1930865631
- The Cult of the Presidency: America's Dangerous Devotion to Executive Power (2008) ISBN 978-1933995199
- False Idol: Barack Obama and the Continuing Cult of the Presidency (2012) ISBN 978-1933995199
- "Drug Prohibition". The Encyclopedia of Libertarianism. Thousand Oaks, CA: Sage; Cato Institute. 2008. pp. 128–129. doi:10.4135/9781412965811.n81. ISBN 978-1412965804. LCCN 2008009151. OCLC 750831024.
