= James Blumstein =

American academic

James F. Blumstein is an American legal and health scholar. He is a professor at Vanderbilt University and is cited by the university as "among the nation's most prominent scholars of health law, law and medicine, and voting rights." He has worked at the law faculty of the university since 1970, teaching health policy and law as well as constitutional law. Blumstein also serves as the director of the university's health policy center, and was recognized for his leadership in health law and policy by being elected a member of the National Academy of Sciences' Institute of Medicine.

In addition to his work at Vanderbilt, Blumstein has been the Olin Visiting Professor at the University of Pennsylvania Law School, an adjunct professor at Dartmouth Medical School, a visiting professor at Duke Law School and at Duke's Institute of Policy Sciences and Public Affairs, and a professor of management at the Owen Graduate School of Management.

Blumstein has served as former Tennessee Governor Phil Bredesen's counsel on TennCare reform and has participated actively in a number of Supreme Court cases, arguing three.

== Education ==
Blumstein graduated from Yale College (B.A., 1966), Yale University (M.A., 1970), and Yale Law School (LL.B., 1970).

== Politics ==
On April 23, 1990, Blumstein was nominated by President George Bush to be the Administrator of the Office of Information and Regulatory Affairs at the Office of Management and Budget.

== Supreme Court Cases ==
In 1970, just weeks after moving to Nashville to join the faculty of Vanderbilt Law School, Blumstein sued the State of Tennessee after being denied the right to register to vote in an upcoming primary election. A state law imposed a one-year residency requirement on citizens moving to Tennessee from other states before being allowed to register, as well as a three-month residency requirement on Tennesseans who had moved to a different county within the state. Apparently, Blumstein was not the only one disenfranchised by the requirements. Another 6.6% of Tennessee residents were disenfranchised as well, mostly educated professionals.

Blumstein had not yet been admitted to the Tennessee Bar when he argued before a three-judge panel on the United States District Court for the Middle District of Tennessee later that year, urging them to strike down the law as unconstitutional disenfranchisement.

At oral argument, Judge Frank Gray pointed out that Blumstein's challenge would be moot by the time the election occurred. Blumstein countered that his claim was in fact not barred by mootness under the doctrine of "capable of repetition, yet evading review," causing Judge Gray to become so irritated that he threw his glasses down on his desk in the process of chiding Blumstein. Not to be deterred, Blumstein wrote a 16-page memorandum detailing his argument to the court. He would learn much later that the memorandum proved instrumental in changing Judge Gray's mind, causing him to scrap a draft opinion holding the three-month residency requirement issue moot.

After losing, Tennessee appealed the case to the Supreme Court, which ruled 6-1 in Blumstein's favor. In Dunn v. Blumstein, the Court held that Tennessee's durational residency requirements for voting violated the Equal Protection Clause under strict scrutiny. Blumstein delivered testimony about his case to the Congressional Subcommittee on the Constitution, Civil Rights and Civil Liberties, saying that it "likely enfranchised more voters than any other single case."

Blumstein argued to the Supreme Court again in Brentwood Academy v. Tennessee Secondary School Athletic Ass'n in 2001, presenting a First-Amendment challenge to a high school athletic association's recruiting rule penalizing certain recruiting practices. The Court ruled 5-4 in favor of the petitioner, holding that "the pervasive entwinement of public institutions and public officials in its composition and workings" made the organization a state actor.

On remand, the case again went to the Supreme Court and Blumstein again delivered oral argument in Tennessee Secondary School Athletic Ass'n v. Brentwood Academy, wherein the Court found no constitutional violation of respondent's First Amendment and Due Process rights had occurred.

== Other Involvement in Litigation ==
Blumstein has been involved in at least 18 other lawsuits on behalf of clients facing such issues as race discrimination in housing, first amendment violations, voting rights violations and more, either as counsel or by filing an amicus brief.

== Personal life ==
Blumstein is married to Andrée Kahn Blumstein, who serves as Tennessee's Solicitor General.

== Awards and honors ==
- The Earl Sutherland Prize for lifetime achievement from Vanderbilt University
- The McDonald-Merrill-Ketcham Memorial Award for Excellence in Law and Medicine from the Indiana University
- The Hall-Hartman Teaching Award from Vanderbilt Law School
- The President's Award from the Tennessee Bar Association
- The Liberty Bell Award from the Nashville Bar Association
- The Paul J. Hartman Award for Outstanding Professor from Vanderbilt Law School
- Blumstein is listed as a contributor to the Federalist Society
- Blumstein was honored by Leadership Nashville for 40 years of service to the organization, which is "an independent executive program designed to strengthen the city by fostering connections among diverse community leaders."

== Literature and Media ==
- Blumstein is the author of Health Care Law and Policy (2nd edition, Foundation Press, 1998 & 2007 supp.) (co-edited with C. Havighurst & T. Brennan), and has published at least 64 articles in scholarly journals.
- Blumstein has published articles in multiple mainstream news outlets, including Forbes, the Wall Street Journal and the Washington Post.
