= Walter Olson =

Legal scholar and author

Walter K. Olson (born 1954) is an American author and blogger who writes mostly about legal subjects, including tort reform. Olson is a senior fellow of the Cato Institute, a libertarian think tank in Washington, D.C. Formerly, Olson was associated with the Manhattan Institute in New York City. He founded several websites, including the Manhattan Institute's scholarly PointOfLaw.com, and continues to run Overlawyered.com, a more popularly oriented website focusing on tort reform and alleged overreaching by lawyers. He has published four books on the American litigation system: The Litigation Explosion, The Excuse Factory, The Rule of Lawyers, and most recently Schools for Misrule. Olson is a Republican. The Washington Post has dubbed Olson an "intellectual guru of tort reform." He has testified to Congress numerous times, and has written articles for publications such as The Wall Street Journal, Reason, Reader's Digest, and The New York Times. His work is often discussed in the press and has been cited in court opinions.

Olson is a graduate of Yale University and was cited in a 2014 list of religious unbelievers with conservative views. Despite being a legal pundit, he lacks a J.D. degree.

Olson has written about redistricting reform and gerrymandering. In 2015 he was appointed by Maryland Gov. Larry Hogan as co-chair of the Maryland Redistricting Reform Commission, which issued recommendations later that year for comprehensive reform. The commission's recommendations served as a basis for legislation Hogan has introduced since then in the Maryland legislature.

== Politics ==
Olson has said that while he campaigned for George W. Bush in 2000, he did not support his re-election in 2004: "Foreign policy and defense blunders aside, the last thing I wanted was an administration combining aggressive social conservatism with uncontrolled spending and big new government programs."

Olson supports same-sex marriage.

== Personal life ==
Olson is married to Steve Pippin, with whom he has adopted a son.

== Bibliography ==
- The Litigation Explosion: What Happened When America Released the Lawsuit. E.P. Dutton/Truman Talley Books, 1991; ISBN 0-525-24911-7
- The Excuse Factory: How Employment Law is Paralyzing the American Workplace. Free Press, 1997; ISBN 0-684-82732-8
- The Rule of Lawyers: How the New Litigation Elite Threatens America's Rule of Law. Truman Talley Books, 2003; ISBN 0-312-28085-8
- Schools for Misrule: Legal Academia and an Overlawyered America. Encounter Books, 2011, ISBN 1-594-03233-5
- Olson, Walter (2008). "Macaulay, Thomas Babington (1800–1859)". The Encyclopedia of Libertarianism. Thousand Oaks, CA: Sage; Cato Institute. pp. 309–310. doi:10.4135/9781412965811.n185. ISBN 978-1412965804. LCCN 2008009151. OCLC 750831024. Ronald Hamowy, editor
