= Cy-près doctrine =

Court amendment of a legal document

The cy-près doctrine (/ˌsiːˈpreɪ/ see-PRAY; Law French, lit. 'so close', modern French: si près or aussi près) is a legal doctrine which allows a court to amend a legal document to enforce it "as near as possible" to the original intent of the instrument, in situations where it becomes impossible, impracticable, or illegal to enforce it under its original terms. The doctrine first arose in the English courts of equity, originating in the law of charitable trusts, but it has since been applied in the context of class action settlements in the United States.

An example of the doctrine's application is found in the Massachusetts Supreme Judicial Court case Jackson v. Phillips, where the testator, Francis Jackson, created a trust to be used to "create a public sentiment that will put an end to negro slavery in this country". Four years after Jackson's death, slavery was abolished by the Thirteenth Amendment, nullifying the express purpose of the trust. Some of Jackson's family members attempted to dissolve the trust in order to collect its proceeds, but the court disagreed, invoking cy-près and finding that Jackson's intent would be best served by using the trust "to promote the education, support and interests of the freedmen, lately slaves, in those states in which slavery had been so abolished".

== England and Wales ==
The cy-près doctrine applied in England and Wales limited the strictness of the rules of mortmain under which property disposed of otherwise than to a legal heir was subject to forfeiture in certain circumstances. Following abolition of mortmain, the modern application of the cy-près doctrine has predominantly occurred in relation to charities, as these are the most important trusts for a general purpose (not private benefit) permitted under English law.

The Charity Commission for England and Wales has the statutory power to apply the cy-près doctrine on behalf of a charity where, for example, no trustees remain in a charity or the necessary mandate cannot be agreed. These powers extend to a corporate charity or unincorporated association (which the common law rules may not cover). Similar powers apply to the equivalent bodies in Northern Ireland and Scotland. The cy-près doctrine will not be applied where a charity has alternative powers to redirect its funds under its constitution.

== United States ==
=== Uniform Trust Code ===
In the United States many states have enacted the Uniform Trust Code ("UTC"). The UTC codifies that cy-près applies only to charitable trusts where the original particular purpose of the trust has become impossible or impracticable, and the terms of the trust do not specify what is to happen in such a situation. The UTC provides that "if a particular charitable purpose becomes unlawful, impracticable, impossible to achieve, or wasteful ... the court may apply cy-près to modify or terminate the trust ... in a manner consistent with the settlor's charitable purposes".

However, the UTC further provides that the court may not apply cy-près where "[a] provision in the terms of a charitable trust ... would result in distribution of the trust property to a noncharitable beneficiary" and also that cy-près may not be used to violate the rule against perpetuities.

The UTC also contains a cy-près rule for noncharitable trusts. It provides that "[t]he court may modify the administrative or dispositive terms of a trust or terminate the trust if, because of circumstances not anticipated by the settlor, modification or termination will further the purposes of the trust".

=== Evans v. Newton (1966) ===
U.S. Senator Augustus Bacon, of Georgia, in his 1911 will, devised land in Macon in trust, to be used as a public park for the exclusive benefit of white people. The park, known as Baconsfield, was operated in that manner for many years. In Evans v. Newton, the Supreme Court of the United States held that the park could not continue to be operated on a racially discriminatory basis. The Supreme Court of Georgia thereupon declared "that the sole purpose for which the trust was created has become impossible of accomplishment" and remanded the case to the trial court, which held cy-près doctrine to be inapplicable, since the park's segregated character was an essential and inseparable part of Bacon's plan. The trial court ruled that the trust failed, and that the property reverted to Bacon's heirs. The Supreme Court of Georgia and the U.S. Supreme Court affirmed. The 50-acre (20 ha) park was lost and commercially developed.

=== Class actions ===
In 1986, the California Supreme Court endorsed cy-près mechanisms in class action settlements, and other American courts followed. Cy-près mechanisms allow money to be used to promote the interests of class members, rather than reverting to a defendant, for example by giving it to a non-profit that advances class members' rights, which could also be seen as a deterrent to a defendant charged with breaking the law, particularly in cases where the harm is widely dispersed. Judge Richard Posner has argued that the term is a misnomer in the class action context, because cy-près awards serve a punitive effect. Some commentators have criticized the use of cy-près settlements; the American Law Institute's Draft of the Principles of the Law of Aggregate Litigation proposes limiting cy-près to "circumstances in which direct distribution to individual class members is not economically feasible, or where funds remain after class members are given a full opportunity to make a claim".

In 2018, the US Supreme Court decided to hear an appeal of the Ninth Circuit decision in In re Google Referrer Header Privacy Litigation, 10-cv-04809, U.S. District Court, Northern District of California (San Jose) that allowed a class action settlement that awarded $2 million to the plaintiff's attorneys, $5,000 to each of the handful of named plaintiffs, and no monetary award to an estimated 129 million class members, citing the cy-près doctrine to give a handful of privacy groups (including all three plaintiffs' attorneys' alma maters and several groups already supported by defendant Google) a share of $6 million rather than any monetary award to class members (who would receive approximately four cents each). The case, Frank v. Gaos, alleges that the award was not "fair, reasonable, and adequate" as required by Rule 23(e)(2) of the Federal Rules of Civil Procedure, and was heard by the Supreme Court in March 2019. The Supreme Court did not decide on the merits of the case, instead remanding the case to the Ninth Circuit to review whether the plaintiffs had standing.
