= Cato Institute =

American libertarian think tank

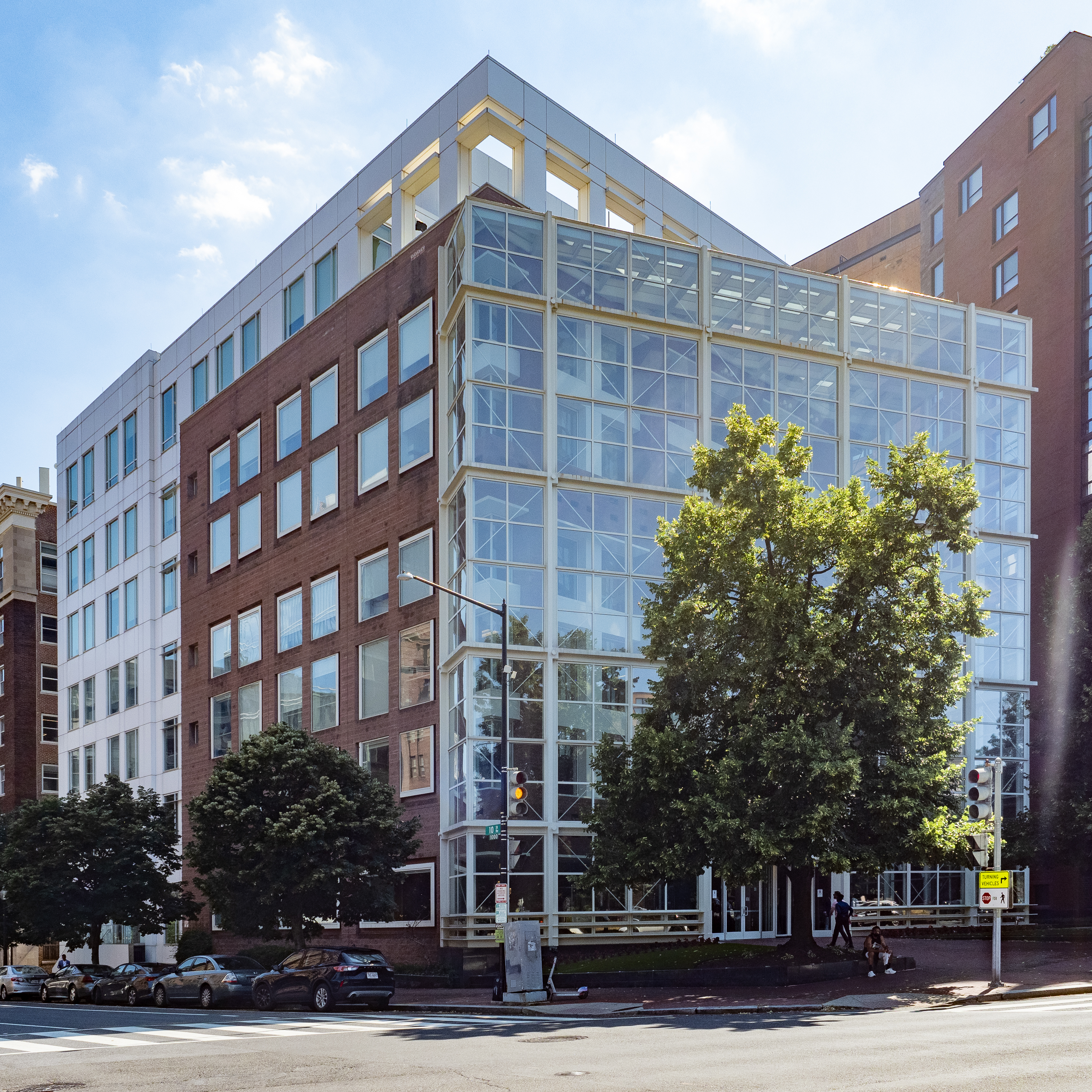
- Established: 1977; 49 years ago
- Founders: Ed Crane; Charles Koch; Murray Rothbard
- Type: 501(c)(3) non-profit think tank
- Tax ID no.: 23-7432162
- Purpose: "To originate, disseminate, and increase understanding of public policies based on the principles of individual liberty, limited government, free markets, and peace."
- Location(s): 1000 Massachusetts Ave. N.W. Washington, D.C., U.S.
- Coordinates: 38°54′12″N 77°01′35″W
- President and CEO: Peter N. Goettler
- Chairman: James M. Lapeyre Jr.
- Revenue: $62.8 million (2024)
- Expenses: $47.3 million (2024)
- Endowment: $172 million (2024)
- Staff: 317 (2024)
- Volunteers: 14 (2024)
- Website: www.cato.org

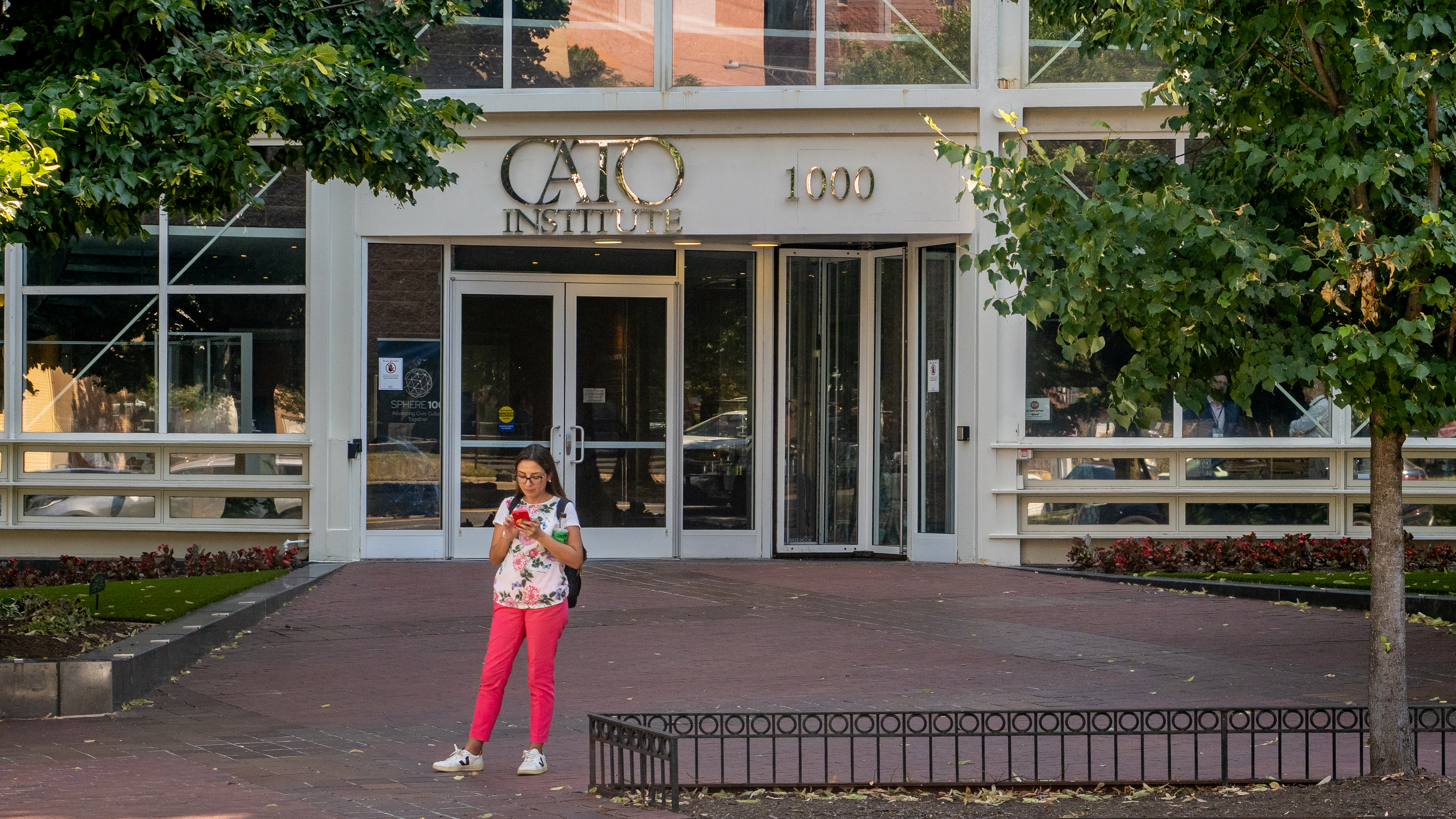
The Cato Institute's headquarters on Massachusetts Avenue in Washington, D.C.

The Cato Institute is an American libertarian think tank headquartered in Washington, D.C. It was founded in 1977 by Ed Crane, Murray Rothbard, and Charles Koch, chairman of the board and chief executive officer of Koch Industries. (Note: Koch Industries is the second largest privately held company by revenue in the United States. "Forbes List". Forbes. Archived from the original on November 7, 2010.) Cato was established to focus on public advocacy, media exposure, and societal influence.

Cato advocates for a limited governmental role in domestic and foreign affairs and strong protection of civil liberties, including support for lowering or abolishing most taxes, opposition to the Federal Reserve system and the Affordable Care Act, the privatization of numerous government agencies and programs including Social Security and the United States Postal Service, demilitarization of the police, open borders and adhering to a non-interventionist foreign policy.

According to the 2019 Global Go to Think Tank Index Report (revised June 2020, Think Tanks and Civil Societies Program, University of Pennsylvania), Cato was number 20 in the "Top Think Tanks Worldwide" and number 13 in the "Top Think Tanks in the United States".

== History ==
=== 20th century ===
The institute was founded in January 1977 in San Francisco, California; named at the suggestion of cofounder Rothbard after Cato's Letters, a series of British essays penned in the early 18th century by John Trenchard and Thomas Gordon.

In 1981, Murray Rothbard was removed from the Cato Institute by the board. That same year, Cato relocated to Washington, D.C., settling initially in a historic house on Capitol Hill. The institute moved to its current location on Massachusetts Avenue in 1993.

=== 21st century ===
In 2009, Cato Institute was the fifth-ranked think tank in the world in a study of think tanks by James G. McGann, at the University of Pennsylvania, based on a criterion of excellence in "producing rigorous and relevant research, publications and programs in one or more substantive areas of research".

In 2015, Cato's revenue exceeded $37 million, and the organization had 124 employees on staff. In 2024, its revenue was reported at more than $71 million.

== Ideological relationships ==
=== Libertarianism and classical liberalism ===
Many Cato scholars have advocated support for civil liberties, liberal immigration policies, drug liberalization, and the repeal of Don't Ask Don't Tell and laws restricting consensual sexual activity. The Cato Institute officially resists being labeled as part of the conservative movement because "'conservative' smacks of an unwillingness to change, of a desire to preserve the status quo".

Cato has strong ties to the political philosophy of classical liberalism. According to former executive vice president David Boaz, libertarians are classical liberals who strongly emphasize the individual right to liberty. He argues that, as the term "liberalism" became increasingly associated with government intervention in the economy and social welfare programs, some classical liberals abandoned the old term and began to call themselves "libertarians". Officially, Cato admits that the term "classical liberal" comes close to the mark of labeling its position, but fails to capture the contemporary vibrancy of the ideas of freedom. According to Cato's mission statement, the Jeffersonian philosophy that animates Cato's work has increasingly come to be called 'libertarianism' or 'market liberalism.' It combines an appreciation for entrepreneurship, the market process, and lower taxes with strict respect for civil liberties and skepticism about the benefits of both the welfare state and foreign military adventurism.

In 2006, Markos Moulitsas of the Daily Kos proposed the term "Libertarian Democrat" to describe his particular liberal position, suggesting that libertarians should be allies of the Democratic Party. Replying, Cato's vice president for research Brink Lindsey agreed that libertarians and liberals should view each other as natural ideological allies, and noted continuing differences between mainstream liberal views on economic policy and Cato's "Jeffersonian philosophy".

=== Objectivism ===
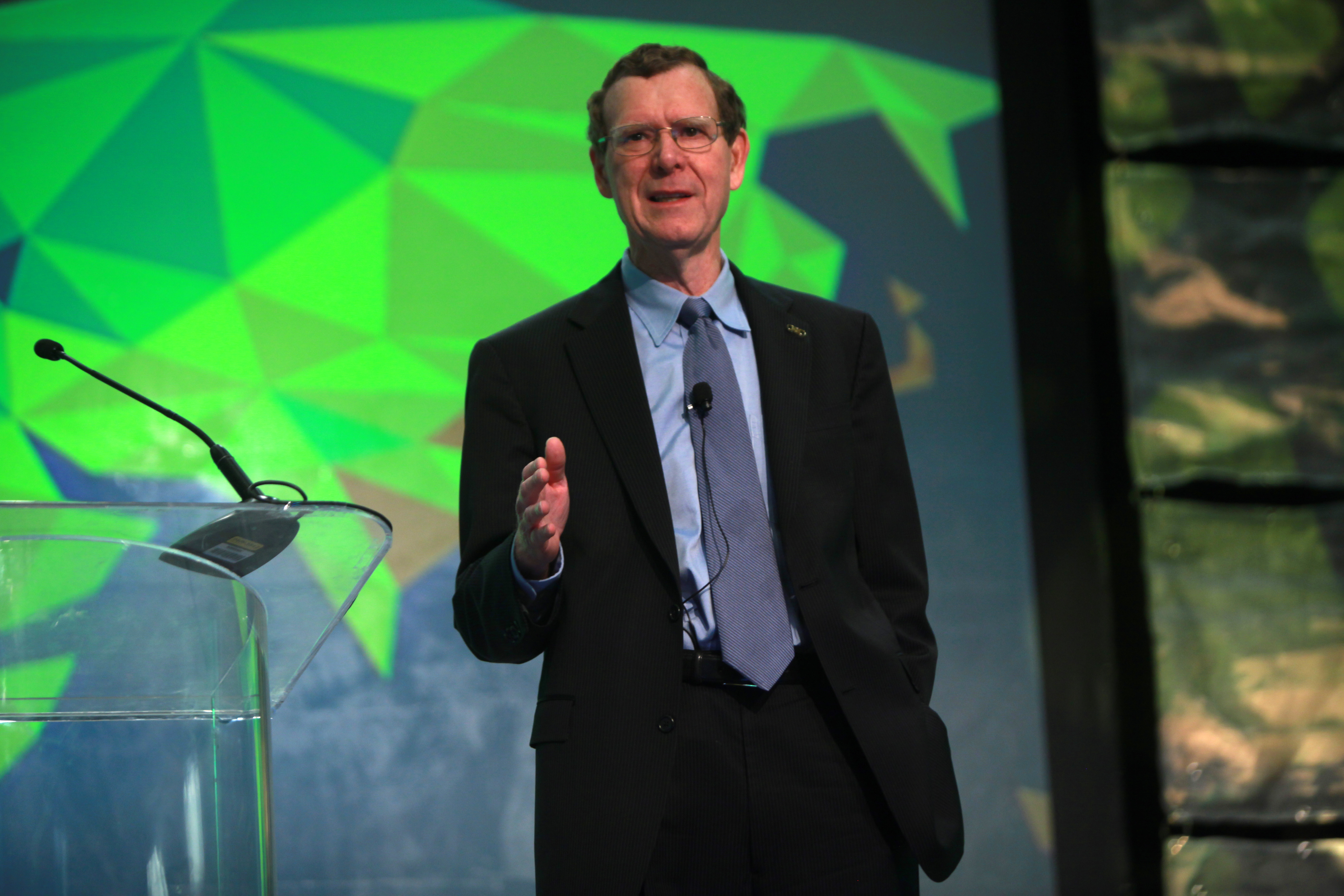
John A. Allison IV, former president of the Cato Institute from 2012 to 2015, speaking at the 2014 International Students for Liberty Conference (ISFLC)

The relationship between Cato and the Ayn Rand Institute (ARI) improved with the nomination of Cato's former president John A. Allison IV in 2012. He is a former ARI board member and is reported to be an "ardent devotee" of Rand who has promoted reading her books to colleges nationwide. In March 2015, Allison retired as president, and is now a Board Member Emeritus. He was succeeded by Peter Goettler.. Cato does not formally advocate for objectivism, though some of its policies are aligned therewith.

== Positions ==
The Cato Institute advocates policies that advance "individual liberty, limited government, free markets, and peace". They are libertarian in their policy positions, typically advocating diminished government intervention in domestic, social, and economic policies and decreased military and political intervention worldwide. Cato was cited by columnist Ezra Klein as nonpartisan, saying that it is "the foremost advocate for small-government principles in American life" and it "advocates those principles when Democrats are in power, and when Republicans are in power"; and Eric Lichtblau called Cato "one of the country's most widely cited research organizations". Nina Eastman reported in 1995 that "on any given day, House Majority Whip Tom DeLay of Texas might be visiting for lunch. Or Cato staffers might be plotting strategy with House Majority Leader Dick Armey, another Texan, and his staff."

=== Defense and foreign policy ===
Cato's non-interventionist foreign policy views, and strong support for civil liberties, have frequently led Cato scholars to criticize those in power, both Republican and Democratic. Cato scholars opposed President George H. W. Bush's 1991 Gulf War operations (a position which caused the organization to lose nearly $1 million in funding), President Bill Clinton's interventions in Haiti and Kosovo, President George W. Bush's 2003 invasion of Iraq, and President Barack Obama's 2011 military intervention in Libya. As a response to the September 11 attacks, Cato scholars supported the removal of al Qaeda and the Taliban regime from power, but were against an indefinite and open-ended military occupation of Afghanistan. In 2015, Cato scholars criticized U.S. involvement in the Saudi Arabian-led intervention in Yemen. Members have been sharply critical of the Trump administration's boat strike campaign in the Caribbean and eastern Pacific, interference in Venezuela, and war with Iran.

Ted Galen Carpenter, Cato's vice president for defense and foreign policy studies, criticized many of the arguments offered to justify the 2003 invasion of Iraq. One of the war's earliest critics, Carpenter wrote in January 2002: "Ousting Saddam would make Washington responsible for Iraq's political future and entangle the United States in an endless nation-building mission beset by intractable problems." Carpenter also predicted: "Most notably there is the issue posed by two persistent regional secession movements: the Kurds in the north and the Shiites in the south." But in 2002 Carpenter wrote, "the United States should not shrink from confronting al-Qaeda in its Pakistani lair", a position echoed in the institute's policy recommendations for the 108th Congress. In 2009, Christopher Preble, then Cato's director of foreign policy studies, argued in The Power Problem: How American Military Dominance Makes Us Less Safe, Less Prosperous, and Less Free, that America's position as an unrivaled superpower tempts policymakers to constantly overreach and to redefine ever more broadly the "national interest". Preble has said that the "scare campaign" to protect military spending from cuts under the Budget Control Act of 2011 backfired.

Cato's foreign and defense policies are guided by the view that the United States is relatively secure and so should engage the world, trade freely, and work with other countries on common concerns—but avoid trying to dominate it militarily. As a result, Cato advocates the United States should be an example of democracy and human rights, not their armed vindicator abroad, claiming it has a rich history, from George Washington to Cold War realists like George Kennan. Cato scholars aim to restore this view, with a principled and restrained foreign policy recommendation, to keep the nation out of most foreign conflicts and be cheaper, more ethical, and less destructive of civil liberties.

=== Domestic policies ===
Cato scholars have consistently called for the privatization of many government services and institutions, including NASA, Social Security, the United States Postal Service, the Transportation Security Administration, public schooling, public transportation systems, and public broadcasting. The institute opposes minimum wage laws, saying that they violate the freedom of contract and thus private property rights, and increase unemployment.

The institute is opposed to expanding overtime regulations, arguing that it will benefit some employees in the short term, while costing jobs or lowering wages of others, and have no meaningful long-term impact. Cato has critiqued child labor prohibitions as a policy tool, instead favoring strategies that expand household income and schooling opportunities. Cato also opposes public sector unions, and supports right-to-work laws. It opposes universal health care, arguing that it is harmful to patients and an intrusion onto individual liberty. It is against affirmative action. It has also called for total abolition of the welfare state, and has argued that it should be replaced with reduced business regulations to create more jobs, and argues that private charities are fully capable of replacing it. Cato has also opposed antitrust laws.

Cato is an opponent of campaign finance reform, arguing that government is the ultimate form of potential corruption and that such laws undermine democracy by undermining competitive elections. Cato also supports the repeal of the Federal Election Campaign Act.

Cato is a fierce foe of the war on drugs, arguing that consenting adults have the right to put any substance they wish to in their bodies and that drug prohibition drives mass incarceration while fueling violent competition between gangs and failing to prevent drug abuse.

Cato has published numerous studies criticizing what it calls "corporate welfare", the practice of public officials funneling taxpayer money, usually via targeted budgetary spending, to politically connected corporate interests.

Cato has published strong criticisms of the 1998 settlement which many U.S. states signed with the tobacco industry.

Cato president Ed Crane and Sierra Club executive director Carl Pope co-wrote a 2002 op-ed piece in The Washington Post calling for the abandonment of the Republican energy bill, arguing that it had become little more than a gravy train for Washington, D.C., lobbyists. Again in 2005, Cato scholar Jerry Taylor teamed up with Daniel Becker of the Sierra Club to attack the Republican Energy Bill as a give-away to corporate interests.

In 2003, Cato filed an amicus brief in support of the Supreme Court's decision in Lawrence v. Texas, which struck down the remaining state laws that made private, non-commercial homosexual relations between consenting adults illegal. Cato cited the 14th Amendment, among other things, as the source of their support for the ruling. The amicus brief was cited in Justice Kennedy's majority opinion for the Court.

In 2004, Cato scholar Daniel Griswold wrote in support of President George W. Bush's failed proposal to grant temporary work visas to otherwise undocumented laborers which would have granted limited residency for the purpose of employment in the U.S.

In 2004, the institute published a paper arguing in favor of "drug reimportation".

In 2006, the Cato Institute published a study proposing a Balanced Budget Veto Amendment to the United States Constitution.

In 2006, Cato published a Policy Analysis criticising the Federal Marriage Amendment as unnecessary, anti-federalist, and anti-democratic. The amendment would have changed the United States Constitution to prohibit same-sex marriage; the amendment failed in both houses of Congress.

A 2006 Cato report by Radley Balko strongly criticized U.S. drug policy and the perceived growing militarization of U.S. law enforcement.

A 2006 study criticized the Digital Millennium Copyright Act.

Cato supports same-sex marriage and filed an amicus brief in the case of Obergefell v. Hodges supporting a constitutional right to same-sex marriage.

Cato does not formally oppose capital punishment; however, they have frequently criticized the practice.

=== Environmental policy ===
Cato scholars have written about the issues of the environment, including global warming, environmental regulation, and energy policy. According to social scientists Riley Dunlap and Aaron McCright the institute is part of a network of organizations that challenges the concept of man-made global warming.

PolitiFact.com and Scientific American have disputed aspects of Cato's climate-related work, arguing that they rely on selective data. A December 2003 Cato panel included Patrick Michaels, Robert Balling and John Christy. Michaels, Balling and Christy agreed that global warming is related at least some degree to human activity, but that many scientists and the media have overstated the danger. The Cato Institute has also criticized political attempts to stop global warming as expensive and ineffective.

The Cato Institute's current official stance on climate change is that "Global warming is indeed real, and human activity has been a contributor since 1975. But global warming is also a very complicated and difficult issue that can provoke very unwise policy in response to political pressure. Although there are many different legislative proposals for substantial reductions in carbon dioxide emissions, there is no operational or tested suite of technologies that can accomplish the goals of such legislation."

Cato scholars were critical of the Bush administration's views on energy policy. In 2003, Cato scholars Jerry Taylor and Peter Van Doren said the Republican Energy Bill was "hundreds of pages of corporate welfare, symbolic gestures, empty promises, and pork-barrel projects". They also spoke out against the former president's calls for larger ethanol subsidies.

With regard to the "Takings Clause" of the United States Constitution and environmental protection, libertarians associated with Cato contended in 2003 that the Constitution is not adequate to guarantee the protection of private property rights.

In 2019, Cato closed its "Center for the Study of Science". E&E News wrote that the center promoted arguments that emphasized scientific disagreement about climate change after its head Pat Michaels had left the institute over disagreements, along with his collaborator Ryan Maue, a meteorologist. By that time, the Cato Institute was also no longer affiliated with its former distinguished fellow Richard Lindzen, an emeritus professor of meteorology at MIT who disagrees with the scientific consensus on climate change.

=== Global freedom ===
Cato's scholars seek to advance policies and support institutions in developing and developed countries that protect human rights and extend the range of personal choices. In particular, Cato's research explores the central role that freedom in its various dimensions—economic, civil, and personal—plays in human progress and in solving some of the world's most pressing problems, including global poverty. To this end Cato co-publishes the annual Human Freedom Index (2015–) with the Fraser Institute and is the co-publisher with Fraser of the U.S. edition of the Economic Freedom of the World annual report (1996–).

=== Immigration ===
Cato argues that most Americans are immigrants or descended from immigrants who sought opportunity and freedom on American shores, and they believe that this continues today with immigrants continuing to become Americans, making the United States a wealthier, freer, and safer country. Cato's research indicates that the current US immigration system excludes the most peaceful and healthy immigrants, and urges policymakers to expand and deregulate legal immigration. Further, Cato supports open borders.

=== Presidential administrations ===
Cato scholars were critical of George W. Bush's Republican administration (2001–2009) on several issues, including education, and excessive government spending. On other issues, they supported Bush administration initiatives, most notably health care, Social Security, global warming, tax policy, and immigration.

During the 2008 U.S. presidential election, Cato scholars criticized both major-party candidates, John McCain and Barack Obama.

Cato has criticized President Obama's stances on policy issues such as fiscal stimulus, healthcare reform, foreign policy, and drug-related matters, while supporting his stance on the repeal of Don't Ask, Don't Tell and his support for the DREAM Act (though not for his implementing its terms through executive action).

Cato opposed Executive Order 13769, which was enacted in January 2017, which decreased the number of refugees admitted into the United States and suspended entry to individuals whose countries do not meet adjudication standards under U.S. immigration law.

==== Trade policy ====
Cato advocates that policymakers must be constantly reminded of the benefits of free trade and the costs of protectionism, arguing free trade is the extension of free markets across political borders. It promotes the idea that enlarging markets to integrate more buyers, sellers, investors, and workers enables more refined specialization and economies of scale, which produce more wealth and higher living standards, and argues that Protectionism does the opposite. Cato's policy recommendations focus on congress and the administration pursuing policies that expand the freedom of Americans to participate in the international marketplace.

== Funding, tax status, and corporate structure ==
The Cato Institute is classified as a 501(c)(3) organization under the U.S. Internal Revenue Code. For revenue, the institute is largely dependent on private contributions and does not receive government funding. The Cato Institute reported the fiscal year 2015 revenue of $37.3 million and expenses of $29.4 million.

The Nation reported support for Cato from the tobacco industry in a 2012 story.

=== Funding details ===
Funding details as of FYE March 2025:

Operating revenue as of FYE March 2025: $65,006,000
1. Individual (78.0%)
2. Foundation (9.00%)
3. Corporate (2.00%)
4. Program and Other Income (11.0%)
Operating expenses as of FYE March 2025: $48,006,000
1. Program (80.0%)
2. Management & General (8.00%)
3. Development (12.0%)

Net assets as of FYE March 2025: $187,075,979.

=== Shareholder dispute and departure of Ed Crane ===
In 2011, there were four shareholders of the Cato Institute: Charles and David Koch, Ed Crane, and William A. Niskanen. Niskanen died in October 2011. In March 2012, a dispute broke out over the ownership of Niskanen's shares. Charles and David Koch filed suit in Kansas, seeking to void his shareholder seat. The Kochs argued that Niskanen's shares should first be offered to the board of the institute, and then to the remaining shareholders, while Crane contended that Niskanen's shares belonged to his widow, Kathryn Washburn, and that the move by the Kochs was an attempt to turn Cato into "some sort of auxiliary for the G.O.P ... It's detrimental to Cato, it's detrimental to Koch Industries, it's detrimental to the libertarian movement." Those who supported Cato's existing management rallied around the "Save Cato" banner, while those who supported the Koch brothers, called "For a Better Cato".

In June 2012, Cato announced an agreement in principle to settle the dispute by changing the institute's governing structure. Under the agreement, a board replaced the shareholders and Crane, who at the time was also chief executive officer, retired. Former BB&T bank CEO John A. Allison IV replaced him. The Koch brothers agreed to drop two lawsuits.

In 2018, several former Cato employees alleged longtime sexual harassment by Crane, going back to the 1990s and continuing until his departure in 2012. Politico reported that he settled one such claim in 2012. Crane denied the allegations.

== Prizes ==
=== Recipients of the Nobel Memorial Prize in Economic Sciences at Cato ===
The following recipients of the Nobel Memorial Prize in Economic Sciences have worked with Cato:

- Gary S. Becker
- James M. Buchanan
- Ronald Coase
- Milton Friedman
- Friedrich Hayek
- Robert Mundell
- Douglass C. North
- Edward C. Prescott
- Thomas C. Schelling
- Vernon L. Smith
- George J. Stigler
- Richard H. Thaler

=== Milton Friedman Prize ===
Since 2002, the Cato Institute has awarded the Milton Friedman Prize for Advancing Liberty every two years to "an individual who has made a significant contribution to advancing human freedom". The prize comes with a cash award of US$250,000.

Friedman Prize winners
Year	Recipient	Nationality
2002	Peter Thomas Bauer	British
2004	Hernando de Soto Polar	Peruvian
2006	Mart Laar	Estonian
2008	Yon Goicoechea	Venezuelan
2010	Akbar Ganji	Iranian
2012	Mao Yushi	Chinese
2014	Leszek Balcerowicz	Polish
2016	Flemming Rose	Danish
2018	Ladies in White	Cuban
2021	Innocence Project	USA
2023	Jimmy Lai	Hong Kong
2025	Charles Koch	USA

== Activities ==
Various Cato Institute programs were favorably ranked in a survey on think tanks published by the University of Pennsylvania in 2012.

=== Publications ===
The Cato Institute publishes policy studies, briefing papers, periodicals, and books. Journals and periodicals include Cato Journal (since 1981), Regulation magazine (acquired in 1990), Cato's Letter, Cato Supreme Court Review, Cato Policy Report, Cato published Inquiry Magazine from 1977 to 1982 (before transferring it to the Libertarian Review Foundation) Literature of Liberty (from 1978 to 1979 before transferring it to the Institute for Humane Studies, which ended its publication in 1982). It also publishes Policy Analysis since 1980. It also publishes a magazine named Free Society.

Cato also co-publishes the annual Human Freedom Index with the Fraser Institute, and is the co-publisher with Fraser of the U.S. edition of the Economic Freedom of the World annual report.

==== Books published by the Cato Institute ====
- Social Security: The Inherent Contradiction (Peter J. Ferrara, 1980, Cato's first book and the first case for privatization)
- Kindly Inquisitors: The New Attacks on Free Thought (Jonathan Rauch, 1993, a Cato co-pub with University of Chicago Press)
- Patient Power: Solving America's Health Care Crisis (John C. Goodman and Gerald L. Musgrave, 1994)
- Cato Handbook for Congress (1995, the first in a series that eventually became the Cato Handbook for Policymakers)
- Cato Pocket Constitution (2002)
- In Defense of Global Capitalism (Johan Norberg, 2003)
- The Improving State of the World: Why We're Living Longer, Healthier, More Comfortable Lives on a Cleaner Planet (Indur Goklany, 2007)
- The Cult of the Presidency: America's Dangerous Devotion to Executive Power (Gene Healy, 2008)
- The Beautiful Tree: A Personal Journey into How the World's Poorest People are Educating Themselves (James Tooley, 2009, winner of the Sir Antony Fisher International Memorial Award)
- The Tyranny of Silence (Flemming Rose, 2014)
- The Conscience of the Constitution: The Declaration of Independence and the Right to Liberty (Timothy Sandefur, 2013)
- The Fire Next Door: Mexico's Drug Violence and the Danger to America (Ted Galen Carpenter, 2016)
- Overcharged: Why Americans Pay Too Much for Health Care (Charles Silver and David A. Hyman, 2018)
- Ten Global Trends Every Smart Person Should Know (Marian Tupy and Ronald Bailey, 2020)
- School Choice Myths: Setting the Record Straight on Education Freedom (Neal McCluskey and Corey A. DeAngelis, 2020)
- Economics in One Virus (Ryan Bourne, 2021)
- The Most Common Arguments against Immigration and Why They're Wrong (Alex Nowrasteh, 2021)
- Eyes to the Sky: Privacy and Commerce in the Age of the Drone (Matthew Feeney, 2021)
- Why, as a Muslim, I Defend Liberty (Mustafa Akyol, 2021)
- The War on Prices: How Popular Misconceptions About Inflation, Prices, and Value Create Bad Policy (Ryan A. Bourne, 2024)

==== Other notable books by Cato scholars ====
- Restoring the Lost Constitution (Randy Barnett, 2003)
- The Encyclopedia of Libertarianism (2008, Ronald Hamowy)
- Islam Without Extremes: A Muslim Case for Liberty (Mustafa Akyol, 2011)
- The Financial Crisis and the Free Market Cure (John A. Allison, 2012)
- The Libertarian Mind: A Manifesto for Freedom (David Boaz, 2015, previously Libertarianism: A Primer)
- The Libertarian Reader (Edited by David Boaz, 2015)
- The Radio Right (Paul Matzko, 2020)
- Rise of the Warrior Cop: The Militarization of America's Police Forces (Radley Balko, 2013)
- Open: The Story of Human Progress (Johan Norberg, 2020)

=== Podcasts ===
- The Cato Daily Podcast, hosted by Caleb O. Brown, allows Cato Institute scholars and other commenters to discuss relevant news and libertarian thought in a conversational, informal manner.
- Power Problems, hosted by John Glaser, is a bi-weekly podcast offering a skeptical take on U.S. foreign policy, and discussion of today's big questions in international security with guests from across the political spectrum.
- Cato Events offers listeners a chance to stay up-to-date on a wide range of essential contemporary issues through presentations by leading national authorities.
- Cato Audio covers important policy debates in Washington.
- Cato Out Loud, provides the most notable of Cato's print publications in an audio format.
- Free Thoughts, hosted by Aaron Ross Powell and Trevor Burrus, is a weekly show about politics and liberty, featuring conversations with top scholars, philosophers, historians, economists, and public policy experts.
- Building Tomorrow, hosted by Paul Matzko, explores the ways technology, innovation, and entrepreneurship are creating a freer, wealthier, and more peaceful world.
- Pop & Locke, hosted by Landry Ayres and Natalie Dowzicky, explores the intersection of political ideas and pop culture.
- Portraits of Liberty investigates the lives and philosophies of thinkers throughout history who argued in favor of a freer world.
- The Pursuit, hosted by Tess Terrible, Landry Ayres, and Natalie Dowzicky, is a podcast about government action and individual liberty.
- Liberty Chronicles, hosted by Anthony Comegna, combines innovative libertarian thinking about history with specialist interviews, primary and secondary sources, and answers to listener questions.
- Excursions into Libertarian Thought, hosted by George H. Smith, explores the history of libertarian ideas.
- Classics of Liberty, hosted by Caleb O. Brown, relives classic works and speeches of classical liberals
- The Human Progress Podcast, hosted by Marian L. Tupy and Chelsea Follett, explores different aspects of progress and the challenges to progress.

=== Web projects ===
In addition to maintaining its own website in English and Spanish, Cato maintains websites focused on particular topics:

- "Downsizing the Federal Government" contains essays on the size of the U.S. federal government and recommendations for decreasing various programs.
- Libertarianism.org is a website focused on the theory and practice of libertarianism.
- Cato Unbound, a web-only publication that features a monthly open debate among four people. The conversation begins with one lead essay, followed by three response essays by separate people. After that, all four participants can write as many responses and counter-responses as they want for the duration of that month.
- PoliceMisconduct.net contains reports and stories from Cato's National Police Misconduct Reporting Project and the National Police Misconduct News Feed.
- Overlawyered is a law blog on the subject of tort reform run by the author Walter Olson.
- HumanProgress.org is an interactive data web project that catalogs increases in prosperity driven by the free market.
- "Public Schooling Battle Map" illustrates different moral conflicts that result from public schooling.
- UnlawfulShield.com is dedicated to abolishing Qualified Immunity.
- FreedomInthe50States.org ranks states by policies that shape personal and economic freedom.

=== Conferences ===
The Cato Institute hosts conferences throughout the year. Topics include monetary policy, the U.S. Constitution, poverty and social welfare, technology and privacy, financial regulation, and civic culture.

Speakers at past Cato Institute conferences have included Federal Reserve Chairmen Alan Greenspan and Ben Bernanke, Federal Reserve Vice Chairman Richard Clarida, International Monetary Fund Managing Director Rodrigo de Rato, Czech Republic President Václav Klaus, and Avanti Financial Group Founder and CEO Caitlin Long.

== Board of directors ==
As of 2020:

- John A. Allison IV, former president and CEO, Cato Institute; retired chairman and CEO, BB&T
- Baron Bond, executive vice president, The Foundation Group LLC
- Rebecca Dunn, Trustee, DUNN Foundation
- Robert Gelfond, CEO and founder, MQS Management
- Peter N. Goettler, president and CEO, Cato Institute; former managing director, Barclays Capital
- David C. Humphreys, president & CEO, TAMKO Building Products, Inc.
- James M. Kilts, partner, Centerview Capital Holdings; former CEO, The Gillette Company
- James M. Lapeyre, Jr., president, Laitram, LLC
- Ken Levy, Levy Family Fund
- Robert A. Levy, chairman, Cato Institute
- Nancy Pfotenhauer, President and CEO, MediaSpeak Strategies
- Lewis E. Randall, former director, E-Trade Financial Corporation
- Howard Rich, chairman, U.S. Term Limits
- Nestor R. Weigand, Jr., chairman and CEO, JP Weigand & Sons, Inc.
- Jeffrey S. Yass, managing director, Susquehana International Group, LLP
- Fred Young, former owner, of Young Radiator Company

== Notable Cato scholars ==
Notable scholars associated with Cato include the following:

=== Policy scholars ===
- Swaminathan Aiyar, research fellow, Center for Global Liberty and Prosperity
- Doug Bandow, senior fellow
- David Boaz, executive vice president
- Michael F. Cannon, director of health policy studies
- Mark A. Calabria, director of financial regulation studies
- Edward H. Crane, founder and president emeritus
- Steve H. Hanke, senior fellow and director, Troubled Currencies Project
- Gene Healy, vice president
- John A. Allison, former president and CEO
- Nat Hentoff, senior fellow
- Deirdre McCloskey, distinguished scholar
- Jeffrey A. Miron, senior fellow
- John Mueller, senior fellow
- William A. Niskanen, chairman and distinguished senior economist
- Johan Norberg, senior fellow
- Alex Nowrasteh, immigration policy analyst
- Walter Olson, senior fellow
- Tom G. Palmer, senior fellow and director of Cato University
- Roger Pilon, vice president for legal affairs
- José Piñera, co-chairman, Project on Social Security Choice
- William Poole, senior fellow
- Alan Reynolds, senior fellow
- Nicholas Quinn Rosenkranz, senior fellow in constitutional studies
- Julian Sanchez, senior fellow
- Cathy Young, cultural studies fellow

=== Adjunct scholars ===
- Patrick Basham (Democracy Institute)
- David E. Bernstein (George Mason University School of Law)
- Donald J. Boudreaux (George Mason University)
- Robert L. Bradley, Jr. (Institute for Energy Research)
- Bryan Caplan (George Mason University)
- John H. Cochrane (University of Chicago Booth School of Business)
- Robert Corn-Revere (Davis Wright Tremaine)
- Tyler Cowen (George Mason University)
- Kevin Dowd (University of Nottingham)
- Richard A. Epstein (New York University School of Law)
- Alex Epstein (Center for Industrial Progress)
- Enrique Ghersi (University of Lima)
- Robert Higgs (The Independent Institute)
- Daniel B. Klein (George Mason University)
- Arnold Kling (George Mason University)
- Chandran Kukathas (London School of Economics)
- Loren Lomasky (University of Virginia)
- Jonathan R. Macey (Yale Law School)
- Tibor R. Machan (Auburn University and Chapman University, Argyros School of Business and Economics)
- Michael Munger (Duke University)
- David G. Post (Temple University Beasley School of Law)
- Alvin Rabushka (Hoover Institution)
- Harvey Silverglate (Foundation for Individual Rights in Education)
- Ilya Somin (George Mason University School of Law)
- Richard L. Stroup (The Independent Institute)
- James Tooley (Newcastle University)
- Lawrence H. White (George Mason University)
- Glen Whitman (Royal Society)
- Walter E. Williams (George Mason University)
- Leland B. Yeager (Auburn University and University of Virginia)

=== Fellows ===
- Radley Balko, media fellow
- Randy E. Barnett, senior fellow
- James M. Buchanan (1919–2013)
- Vladimir Bukovsky, senior fellow
- F. A. Hayek (1899–1992)
- Penn Jillette, H.L. Mencken research fellow
- Václav Klaus, distinguished senior fellow
- Deepak Lal, senior fellow
- Christopher Layne, visiting fellow in foreign policy studies
- Jeffrey Milyo, senior fellow
- P. J. O'Rourke (1947–2022)
- Jim Powell, senior fellow
- Richard W. Rahn, senior fellow
- George Selgin, senior fellow
- Vernon L. Smith, senior fellow
- Teller, H.L. Mencken research fellow

== Affiliations ==
The Cato Institute is an associate member of the State Policy Network, a U.S. national network of free-market oriented think tanks.

== Rankings ==
According to the 2020 Global Go To Think Tank Index Report (Think Tanks and Civil Societies Program, University of Pennsylvania), Cato is number 27 in the "Top Think Tanks Worldwide" and number 13 in the "Top Think Tanks in the United States". Other "Top Think Tank" rankings include # 13 (of 85) in Defense and National Security, #5 (of 80) in Domestic Economic Policy, #4 (of 55) in Education Policy, #17 (of 85) in Foreign Policy and International Affairs, #8 (of 30) in Domestic Health Policy, #14 (of 25) in Global Health Policy, #18 (of 80) in International Development, #14 (of 50) in International Economic Policy, #8 (of 50) in Social Policy, #8 (of 75) for Best Advocacy Campaign, #17 (of 60) for Best Think Tank Network, #3 (of 60) for best Use of Social Networks, #9 (of 50) for Best External Relations/Public Engagement Program, #2 (of 40) for Best Use of the Internet, #12 (of 40) for Best Use of Media, #5 (of 30) for Most Innovative Policy Ideas/Proposals, #11 (of 70) for the Most Significant Impact on Public Policy, and #9 (of 60) for Outstanding Policy-Oriented Public Programs. Cato also topped the 2014 list of the budget-adjusted ranking of international development think tanks.

== See also ==
- American Enterprise Institute
- Brookings Institution
- Foundation for Economic Education
- Fraser Institute
- The Heartland Institute
- Reason Foundation
- Tax resistance
