= Occupational health and safety in the casino industry =

There are unique occupational health issues in the casino industry, many of which are attributed to repetitive tasks and long-term exposures to hazards in the casino environment. Among these issues are cancers resulting from exposure to second-hand tobacco smoke, musculoskeletal injury (MSI) from repetitive motion injuries while running table games over many hours, and health issues associated with shift work. Safety and regulatory agencies in the United States have implemented regulatory measures to address the specific risks associated with workers in the casino industry, and have made efforts to identify additional possible risks to casino workers, including noise-induced hearing loss and heavy metal poisoning from exposure to dust from coins.

== Regulation ==
In the United States, the Occupational Safety and Health Administration (OSHA) is empowered to educate employers and workers, set workplace standards, and enforce violations. OSHA requires casinos to have a written safety plan specific to their location which commonly addresses risk factors for workers such as ergonomics, blood-born pathogens, personal protective equipment, food service, housekeeping, and slips/trips/falls. Taken from regulations for sporting events, there are additional requirements for casino employees working in entertainment to help workers avoid hazards, injuries, and illness caused by theatrical scenery/rigging/props, wardrobe/hair/makeup, and audio/camera/projection/video/lighting.

As of January 1, 2018, workers in Nevada have a 10-hour training course on these subject they must complete within 15 days of being hired. They must renew this certification every five years. These rules are in place to prevent workplace hazards, injuries, and deaths which have occurred during performances.

The National Institute of Occupational Safety & Health (NIOSH) conducts free workplace Health Hazard Evaluations (HHE) under 29 U.S.C. 669(a)(6) to identify workplace health hazards and make recommendations to reduce hazards. NIOSH has evaluated casinos in the United States regarding employee exposure to second hand smoke, noise, and metal coin dust.

== Hazards ==
=== Second hand smoke ===
The primary cancer risk factor for casino workers is thought to be due to second hand smoke which can increase the risk of both lung cancer and breast cancer (42% higher) compared to the general population's risk. Second hand smoke contains 700 chemicals that are known to cause cancer. The Surgeon General of the United States determined in 2006 that exposure to second hand smoke is not safe at any level as smoke cannot be filtered by ventilation systems and separate "no smoking" areas do not keep smoke out. More typically, the heating and cooling systems distribute smoke throughout the building, rather than removing it. Employees working in casinos have historically had higher levels of exposure to nicotine than other employees in the United States who reported exposure to second hand smoke. Second hand smoke among casino workers is estimated to cost $112 per casino worker, per year in direct medical costs.

In 1995, NIOSH evaluated non-smoking casino workers who worked in casinos that allowed smoking. The study found that these workers were exposed to elevated levels of nicotine in the air. The American Conference of Governmental Industrial Hygienists (ACGIH) publishes Threshold Limit Values (TLVs) for chemical and physical agents as well as Biological Exposure Indices (BEIs) each year that establishes a maximum exposure recommendation based on current scientific knowledge. As of 2018, the ACGIH recommends employees not be exposed to an eight-hour time-weighted average (TWA) of more than 0.5 μg/m^{3} to prevent damage to the gastrointestinal tract, heart, brain or spinal cord. In studying these non-smoking casino workers, NIOSH found they were exposed to nicotine levels in the air of 6-12 μg/m^{3}. The investigators also took urine samples of the workers to estimate the internal dose the workers were absorbing and found they had blood cotinine (a metabolite of nicotine) levels of 1.85 ng/ml after their shift. NIOSH monitored employees working in both "smoking" and "non-smoking" sections of the casino and found elevated levels of exposure in both, as measured in the air (externally) and in the worker's blood (internally). While all areas measured were above the recommended exposure limit, the highest concentrations were found at the poker tables. The national average at the time for non-smokers exposed in their work or home was 0.93 ng/ml. As a result of this study, NIOSH recommended that employees not be involuntarily exposed to smoke in the workplace. However, NIOSH is only a research agency and their recommendations do not have the force of law or ability to force employers to comply. Studies in casinos before and after smoking bans were enacted showed a decrease of 85-95% in cancer causing agents. Based on these studies, NIOSH expanded its recommendation to make casinos in the United States 100% smoke free in 2009. As of January 2023 there were 260 commercial and 148 Tribal Casinos in the United states, which don't permit smoking on the casino floor.

=== Noise-induced hearing loss ===
Casinos can protect their employees from high levels of ambient noise by locating their performing entertainment and slot machines in a separate physical location. NIOSH has conducted one noise evaluation of a casino in 2003, but did not find any evidence that noise in that casino was loud enough to put employees at risk of hearing loss. As a preventative measure going forward, NIOSH recommended that noise levels be reevaluated whenever a new piece of equipment is installed or whenever employees express concerns about the noise level. NIOSH generally recommends that such noise assessments be conducted on the busiest nights of the week or whenever the noise is likely to be loudest as that is the time of greatest risk to workers and patrons.

The ACGIH eight hour Threshold Limit Value (TLV) for sound is 85 A-weighted decibel (dBA). Exposure at or below this level of sound is expected to protect most workers from noise induced hearing loss over a 40-year career. ACGIH's exposure limits are recommendations based on the most current science, though OSHA's standard still allows employers to expose workers to a maximum permissible exposure level (PEL) of 90 dBA for eight hours each day under 29 CFR 1910.95. OSHA also a 5 dBA exchange allowing this to increase to 100 dBA for four hours of work or decrease to 85 dBA when working a 16-hour shift. Casino workers were generally found to be exposed to an eight hour TWAs noise level of 76.4-81.8 dBA. Another key takeaway of the noise evaluation of the casino was that the highest noise detected was in the children's arcade with levels reaching 78 – 84 dBA.

=== Metal dust from coin counting ===
In 2000, NIOSH was asked to evaluate a casino for metal dust after employees reported eye, nose, and airway irritation that they thought might be related to the process used to count metal coins. NIOSH evaluated the air and employees for nickel, copper, and zinc because these metals make up the vast majority of modern US coins. All levels were below the NIOSH recommended exposure limit (REL), specifically nickel was 7 μg/m3 (REL 15 μg/m3), copper was 24 μg/m3 (REL 1,000 μg/m3), and zinc was below the limit of detection (REL 5,000 μg/m3).

=== Shift work ===
Those who work the night shift are known to be at increased risk of insomnia, disease, and death. Studies of casino shift workers have found increased emotional and behavioral problems in their children as well as a six-times higher rate of divorce in men with children who have been married less than 5 years. Women with children were also three times more likely to get divorced while performing shift work at casinos. However, there was no increased rate of divorce in couples without children who performed shift work at casinos. A 2012 study by the Kansas Health Institute recommended that casinos try to minimize this risk by keeping each worker on a consistent shift, rather than rotating them between days and nights. It stated that if shift rotation must occur, it is better to rotate employees forward from day into evening shifts.

An increased frequency of breast cancer of 35% has also been found in women who work night shifts.

=== Injuries ===
Efficiently dealing or running table games often require workers to perform the same motion over and over for many hours, potentially causing repetitive strain injuries. The repeated lifting and reaching needed to successfully run table games may lead to musculoskeletal injury (MSI). Musculoskeletal injuries in casino workers are most common in the upper extremity, back, and legs. A table with a softer edge for the dealer to lean against will decrease nerve compression in the upper extremity. Carpal tunnel, a disorder caused by compressing the median nerve as it passes through the wrist into the hand, has been found more frequently in table game dealers.

In casinos, burns most commonly occur in preparation or delivery of foods, beverages, or oils since liquid or steam at only 155°F can burn or scald the skin.

Emotions can run high during gambling and this, combined with alcohol, which is often provided for free while playing, can lead patrons to become aggressive and agitated toward the staff or other players, potentially leading to assault and battery. Casinos also frequently have large amounts of money present, increasing the possibility of a robbery that can put an employee in a dangerous situation.

=== Psychosocial hazards ===
Casino workers have had panic attacks at work when the casino is understaffed. They are also known to be at higher risk for gambling problems, alcoholism, and depression than the average person.
