= Tar (tobacco residue) =

Tobacco smoke residue

Tar is the name for the resinous, combusted particulate matter made by the burning of tobacco and other plant material in the act of smoking. Tar is toxic and damages the smoker's lungs over time through various biochemical and mechanical processes. Tar also damages the mouth by rotting and blackening teeth, damaging gums, and desensitizing taste buds. Tar includes the majority of mutagenic and carcinogenic agents in tobacco smoke. Polycyclic aromatic hydrocarbons (PAH), for example, are known carcinogens. The amount of tar in tobacco smoke is mathematically determined by subtracting the weight of the nicotine and water from the weight of the total particulate matter (TPM).

Cigarette companies in the United States, when prompted to give tar/nicotine ratings for cigarettes, usually use "tar", in sneer quotes, to distance it from the tar used to surface roads. Tar is occasionally said to stand for total aerosol residue; this is a backronym coined in the mid-1960s.

Tar, when in the lungs, coats the cilia, causing them to stop working and eventually die. This causes conditions such as lung cancer as the toxic particles in tobacco smoke are no longer trapped by the cilia but enter the alveoli directly. Thus, the alveoli cannot properly conduct gas exchange, causing symptoms including shortness of breath and low blood oxygen.

Cannabis when smoked also creates residue that is very similar to that of tobacco residue.

== Long-term effects ==
=== Lung cancer ===
One of the most well known diseases caused by smoking is lung cancer. A few carcinogens commonly found in tar include benzene, acrylamide and acrylonitrile. Smoking exposes delicate cells inside the lungs directly to these compounds. This causes mutations in the DNA of the cells, which leads to cancer. According to the World Health Organization's report, "Tobacco Smoke and Involuntary Smoking", 80 percent of all cases of lung cancer are attributable to smoking.

=== Third-hand smoking and its effects ===
Third-hand smoke is residual nicotine and other chemicals left on a variety of indoor surfaces by tobacco smoke. This residue reacts with indoor pollutants to create a toxic mix. Containing cancer-causing substances, this third-hand smoke poses a potential health hazard to nonsmokers who are exposed to it, especially children.

Studies have shown that third-hand smoke clings to many things such as hair, skin, clothes, furniture, drapes, walls, bedding, carpets, dust, vehicles and other surfaces, even long after smoking has stopped. Individuals at risk such as infants, children and nonsmoking adults may suffer tobacco-related health problems when they inhale, ingest or touch substances containing third-hand smoke. Third-hand smoke is a relatively new concept, and researchers are still studying its possible dangers.

Third-hand smoking can be a serious concern, as it affects other people's health. In a house, the tobacco residue of the smoke can build up on surfaces over time. Unfortunately, excess smoke cannot be removed just by airing out rooms and opening windows. Scientists have reported that third-hand smoke may cause up to 60 percent of the harm caused by regular exposure to smoke.

=== Second-hand smoking vs third-hand smoking ===
Second-hand smoking (SHS) is a combination of sidestream smoke (i.e., smoke emitted from the burning cigarette, pipe, or cigar) and the mainstream smoke exhaled from the lungs of smokers. It contains more than 4,000 chemicals, many of which are known to affect health. These may include ammonia, acrolein, carbon monoxide, hydrogen cyanide, nicotine, nitrogen oxides, arsenic, and sulfur dioxide, many of which contain irritants and toxicants to the eye and respiratory tract.

Third-hand smoking (THS) consists of residual tobacco smoke pollutants that remain on surfaces and in dust after tobacco has been smoked, are re-emitted into the gas phase, or react with oxidants and other compounds in the environment to yield secondary pollutants. Chemicals of tobacco smoking include nicotine, 3-ethenylpyridine (3-EP), phenol, cresols, naphthalene, formaldehyde, and tobacco-specific nitrosamines (including some not found in freshly-emitted tobacco smoke).
