= Center for Indoor Air Research =

Tobacco industry front group

- Abbreviation: CIAR
- Formation: March 1988
- Dissolved: November 16, 1998; 27 years ago
- Type: Non-profit
- Legal status: Defunct
- Headquarters: Linthicum, Maryland

The Center for Indoor Air Research (often abbreviated CIAR) was a tobacco industry front group established by three American tobacco companies—Philip Morris, R.J. Reynolds, and Lorillard—in Linthicum, Maryland, in 1988. The organization funded research on indoor air pollution, some of which pertained to passive smoking and some of which did not. It also funded research pertaining to causes of lung cancer other than passive smoking, such as diet. The organization disbanded in 1998 as a result of the Tobacco Master Settlement Agreement.

== History ==
The CIAR was founded in March 1988 by Philip Morris, R.J. Reynolds, and Lorillard. It was based in Linthicum, Maryland. The Swedish tobacco company Svenska Tobaks joined the organization in 1994. Soon after it was founded, it became the largest non-governmental source of funding for research on indoor air pollution. In 1998, a master settlement, known as the Tobacco Master Settlement Agreement, was reached between American tobacco companies and a number of American state attorneys general. This agreement required the tobacco industry to disband the CIAR, as well as the Council for Tobacco Research. According to Alisa Tong and Stanton Glantz, the CIAR has "been essentially reconstituted as the Philip Morris External Research Program."

== Stated mission ==
The original stated mission of the CIAR was to conduct "high-quality, objective research" pertaining to indoor air, including the health effects of environmental tobacco smoke (ETS). A confidential memo from 1988 described the CIAR as part of a plan to "carry out work on ETS to keep the controversy alive." In 1992, the reference to passive smoking was removed from the organization's mission statement. This was, in turn, followed by a decrease in the amount of research funded by the CIAR that pertained to the health effects of passive smoking.

== Structure ==
The CIAR awarded both "peer-reviewed" projects after review by their Science Advisory Board, as well as "special-reviewed" projects awarded after review by tobacco company executives. The aim of the CIAR's peer-reviewed projects was mainly to divert attention from ETS as an indoor air pollutant, whereas special-reviewed projects were more likely to produce evidence that the tobacco industry could later use to argue against anti-smoking legislation.

== Funding of scientific research ==
From 1989 to 1999, the CIAR funded at least 244 published studies. The CIAR has been called "a buffer between the tobacco industry and scientists." This refers to the fact that many scientists who published research favorable to the industry's position on ETS, although unwilling to accept funds directly from the tobacco industry, were willing to (and often did) accept funds from the CIAR. The majority of peer-reviewed studies funded by the CIAR were unrelated to ETS, and served instead to divert attention from its health effects and focus attention on other indoor air toxins instead. Anti-smoking activists argued that the center was a front for the tobacco industry, and that the industry funding the center received "tainted" the research it funded.

Beginning in 1988, Philip Morris funded a study investigating the air quality in the cabin of Scandinavian Airlines planes. Philip Morris then hired the Netherlands Organization for Applied Scientific Research (TNO) to collect data for the study, though the industry, through CIAR, still controlled the study's conclusions and the way its results were presented. Accordingly, CIAR subsequently asked TNO to remove 21 pages of analysis from the report, and TNO complied. In 1992, a CIAR-funded study conducted by Healthy Buildings International was published in Environment International. A Congressional inquiry subsequently found that 25% of the data may have been falsified, although the study's author has disputed this conclusion. Also in 1992, the CIAR awarded $72,760 to Antonio H. Miguel, Jari Cardoso, and Aquino Neto to study indoor air quality in offices and restaurants in the Brazilian cities of São Paulo and Rio de Janeiro. The CIAR also awarded Miguel additional funding in 1998 for another indoor air quality study, this time measuring air quality in Santiago, Chile, and São Paulo, Brazil. This study was based on the hypothesis that although both outdoor air and ETS could increase aerosol concentrations indoors, outdoor air was responsible for a significantly larger proportion of indoor aerosol concentrations than ETS was. The CIAR also funded research by Arthur Penn, of New York University, into the effects of exposure to tobacco smoke in chickens from 1990 to 1994. After some of his studies found that this exposure caused increased plaque buildup in the chickens' arteries, the CIAR refused to fund any more of his work. Another study funded by the CIAR was authored by Johns Hopkins researcher Genevieve Matanoski in 1995, and claimed that some cases of lung cancer previously attributed to passive smoking might actually be caused by other factors, such as diet. Another was the "16 cities study", authored by Roger Jenkins and published in 1996, examining levels of second-hand smoke measured by subjects in sixteen cities at work and at home. The study concluded that homes were a greater source of exposure to second-hand smoke than workplaces, which led the tobacco industry to use its conclusions to argue that workplace smoking restrictions were unnecessary. This study has been criticized for suffering from "serious biases" that led to low values of exposure being reported.

=== Epidemiologic studies ===
In 1995, a CIAR-funded study on secondhand smoke exposure by Peter Lee was published. The tobacco industry hoped that the study would undermine the validity of a 1981 study by Takeshi Hirayama, which reported a positive association between secondhand smoke and lung cancer risk. The final paper concluded that studies like Hirayama's were subject to misclassification bias, and therefore, had "little scientific basis". In 1995, the journal Regulatory Toxicology and Pharmacology published two studies funded by the CIAR examining the association between ETS and heart disease. Both studies concluded that ETS exposure from spouses did not increase the risk of heart disease, and that previous conclusions to the contrary were due to publication bias. Both of these studies have been criticized for suffering from exposure misclassification, because both studies failed to distinguish between current and former smokers. In 2003, a study funded by the center was published in the BMJ. Authored by James Enstrom and Geoffrey Kabat, the study found little association between secondhand smoke and coronary heart disease or lung cancer. This study has been criticized for failing to distinguish between those who were exposed to second-hand smoke and those who were not, because, according to the American Cancer Society, the study's participants were enrolled in 1959, "when exposure to secondhand smoke was so pervasive that virtually everyone was exposed to ETS, whether or not they were married to a smoker." In a US racketeering lawsuit against tobacco companies, the Enstrom and Kabat paper was cited by the US District Court as "a prime example of how nine tobacco companies engaged in criminal racketeering and fraud to hide the dangers of tobacco smoke."

== Efforts to influence IARC ==
In the 1990s, the CIAR's executive director met with head investigators from the International Agency for Research on Cancer (IARC), hoping to persuade them to cooperate with CIAR. These efforts were mostly unsuccessful, though the CIAR did hire one IARC investigator to conduct a study. Tobacco companies, through the CIAR, subsequently funded research aimed at undermining the validity of epidemiologic research, intending to have these studies published before the IARC released its then-ongoing study on secondhand smoke. In 1997, the CIAR co-hosted a conference in China, along with the Guangzhou Institute for Chemical Carcinogens and the Chinese Epidemiological Association. The conference, entitled "International Workshop on Risk Assessment and Good Epidemiological Practices", brought together over 100 lung cancer researchers, some of whom had received tobacco industry funding. The workshop was part of the industry's "Asia-specific IARC preparation" effort to convince the public and the media to view the IARC report skeptically when it was published.

== See also ==
- Foundation for a Smoke-Free World
- Tobacco Institute
