= Smoke-free multi-unit housing =

Type of residential smoking ban

Smoke-Free Multi-Unit Housing refers to a ban on smoking tobacco products in multiple‐unit or multi‐unit housing (MUH) complexes, which are defined as a public or private building, or portion thereof, containing two or more dwelling or other housing units including, but not limited to, a building with live/work units, apartment buildings, condominiums, senior citizen residences, nursing homes, housekeeping room/units, residential or single room occupancy hotels, and other multi-unit residential dwellings, group housing, or boarding facilities. According to recent estimates, within the United States, roughly 80 million (1 in 4) residents live in multi-unit housing complexes and more than 1 in 3 renters are exposed to secondhand smoke.

== Origins ==
The first smoke-free multi-unit housing ordinance in the U.S. occurred in Belmont, California, due to the advocacy efforts of a group of low-income senior citizen residents who were frustrated by the drifting secondhand smoke from their neighbors. In November 2006, the Belmont City Council voted unanimously to pursue a comprehensive ordinance that would prohibit smoking almost anywhere in the city, except single-family detached homes. An ordinance making smoke-free all multi-unit housing, as well as many outdoor areas, was adopted in October 2007 and sparked the interest of city officials from around the nation and the world.

== Dangers of secondhand smoke ==
Secondhand smoke is a major cause of disease and premature death, including lung cancer, heart disease, and respiratory problems in nonsmoking adults. According to the U.S. Surgeon General, there is no safe level of secondhand smoke exposure. Children exposed to secondhand smoke are at increased risk of Sudden Infant Death Syndrome (SIDS) and are more susceptible to respiratory infections, asthma, and ear infections. One study showed that children who live in homes in which no one smokes inside have a 45% increase in cotinine levels if they live in multi-unit housing compared with detached homes, due to seepage through walls and shared ventilation systems. Exposure to secondhand smoke makes breathing difficult, and is also a significant risk factor for many underlying health conditions linked to more severe COVID-19 disease symptoms, including heart disease, diminished lung function, and associated risk of respiratory illnesses.

Secondhand smoke exposure in multi-unit housing is a serious health threat because secondhand smoke drifts into housing units from neighboring units, balconies, patios, and common areas. The most effective way to address this problem and protect tenants from secondhand smoke is to pass a strong policy making, at a minimum, all units and indoor common areas in a building smoke-free.

== Definition of multi-unit housing ==
Multi-unit housing, also known as multi-family housing, is defined by the sharing of walls between units in a building. A multi-family building consists of two or more attached units including duplexes, apartment buildings, condominium complexes, senior and assisted living facilities, and long-term health care facilities. Different jurisdictions have had more or less inclusive definitions within their smoke-free ordinances. Currently, the definition of multi-unit housing does not include mobile home parks, campgrounds, marinas and ports, single-family homes (unless they are child care or healthcare facilities, or have an in-law/second unit), hotels or motels (under California Civil Code section 1940, subdivision (b)(2).

== Terms of tenancy ==
In addition to banning smoking in multi-unit housing residences such as apartment buildings and condos, smoke-free housing laws usually change terms of tenancy for rental units, making it a lease violation to smoke in a nonsmoking unit. These lease changes are automatic for new leases and upon renewal for existing leases. Declaring secondhand smoke as a nuisance is another option for city and county governments.

== Smoking and rent control ==
Communities with rent control laws have differing options in passing a smoke-free multi-unit housing policy as landlords are restricted in changing terms of tenancy without the consent of the tenant. One option is to prohibit smoking in new tenancies and even some existing tenancies. In May 2014, the city of Berkeley was the first rent control city in California to adopt a smoke-free multi-unit housing law with a city enforcement mechanism in place that covers all newly initiated leases while encouraging those with existing leases to sign a new non-smoking lease addendum on a voluntary basis. With this law, all residents of multi-unit housing including condos and rent-controlled units are covered.

== Passing a policy ==
While a county-wide smoke-free multi-unit housing ordinance may indicate a county-wide stance on the issue, it is not enforceable outside of the unincorporated areas of the county. In the incorporated areas, also known as cities, smoke-free multi-unit housing policies must be introduced through the City Council and passed on a city-by-city basis. Community members indicate the need for a citywide smoke-free multi-unit housing ordinance to their City Council — through public comment, meetings, and/or letters.

The City staff will take this direction and look at existing policies to draft a smoke-free multi-unit housing ordinance that anticipates the specific needs of their City. This ordinance will be placed on the calendar for a first reading at a City Council meeting, where Councilmembers will ask clarifying questions about the ordinance and raise any concerns. If it passes the first reading, city staff will then do further research, and incorporate any feedback into a modified draft if needed. This draft will be reviewed at the second reading, where the ordinance will pass if it looks acceptable to a majority of City Council members (for instance, 3 out of 5).

== Municipalities with laws addressing multi-unit housing ==
After Belmont passed its smoke-free multi-unit housing policy, other cities began to follow suit. As of June 2020, 63 jurisdictions in California have enacted municipal laws at the city or county level that prohibit smoking in 100% of private units of all specified types of multi-unit housing. These laws typically apply to both privately owned and publicly owned multi-unit buildings. Such laws apply to all existing and future buildings and do not permit current residents to continue smoking in the building (that is, no “grandfathering” clause). This includes: Alameda, Albany, Belmont, Belvedere, Benicia, Berkeley, Beverly Hills, Brisbane, Burlingame, Clayton, Compton, Contra Costa County, Cotati, Culver City, Daly City, Danville, El Cerrito, El Monte, Emeryville, Foster City, Firebaugh, Half Moon Bay, Healdsburg, Huntington Park, Larkspur, Los Gatos, Manhattan Beach, Mill Valley, Millbrae, Moorpark, Mountain View, Morro Bay, Novato, Pacifica, Palo Alto, Pasadena, Petaluma, Pleasanton, Redwood City, Richmond, Rohnert Park, Ross, San Anselmo, San Bruno, San Carlos, San Mateo (city), San Mateo County, San Pablo, San Rafael, Santa Clara County, Santa Rosa, Saratoga, Sebastopol, Sonoma (city), Sonoma County, South San Francisco, Sunnyvale, Tiburon, Union City, Walnut Creek, and Windsor.

In addition, 19 jurisdictions in California have municipal laws at the city or county level that do not prohibit smoking in all units of all multi-unit residential buildings in the community but restrict smoking in private units of some specified types of multi-unit buildings. These laws typically apply to both privately owned and publicly owned multi-unit housing. This includes: Baldwin Park, Burbank, Calabasas, Corte Madera, Dublin, Fairfax, Glendale, Lafayette, Loma Linda, Marin County, Moorpark, Oakley, Pinole, Pleasant Hill, Rohnert Park, Santa Monica, Sausalito, South Pasadena, and Temecula.
