= Dale Sandler =

American epidemiologist

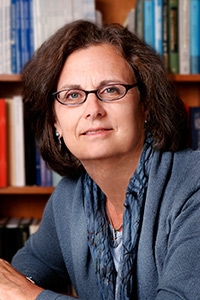
- Born: Dale Pearlman
- Education: Boston University; Yale University; Johns Hopkins University
- Awards: Dr. Nathan Davis Award (2015)
- Scientific career
- Fields: Epidemiology, environmental health
- Workplaces: National Institute of Environmental Health Sciences
- Thesis: Health Consequences of Nasopharyngeal Radium Irradiation (1979)
- Doctoral advisor: Genevieve Matanoski

Dale Pearlman Sandler is an American epidemiologist specialized in prospective cohort studies designed to study the impact of environmental exposures on population health. She is chief of the Epidemiology Branch at the National Institute of Environmental Health Sciences. Sandler is a past president of the American College of Epidemiology and received a Dr. Nathan Davis Award in 2015.

== Education ==
Sandler completed a B.A. in Mathematics and Philosophy, cum laude at the Boston University College of Arts and Sciences in June 1972. She earned a M.P.H. in Chronic Disease Epidemiology from Yale School of Medicine in May 1975. Her thesis was titled Serum Cholesterol, Serum Uric Acid, and ABO Blood Groups in West Point Cadets. In October 1979, Sandler completed a Ph.D. in Epidemiology at the Johns Hopkins School of Hygiene and Public Health. Her dissertation was titled Health Consequences of Nasopharyngeal Radium Irradiation. Genevieve Matanoski was Sandler's doctoral advisor.

== Career and research ==
Sandler joined the National Institute of Environmental Health Sciences (NIEHS) in 1979 as a health statistician. She heads the Chronic Disease Epidemiology group and has been chief of the Epidemiology Branch in the Division of Intramural Research at NIEHS since 2003. Stephanie J. London is the Deputy Chief. Sandler is adjunct professor of Epidemiology at the University of North Carolina at Chapel Hill. Sandler has authored more than 230 articles in peer-reviewed journals.

Sandler's research involves prospective cohort studies designed to study the impact of environmental exposures on population health. She is a principal investigator of the following three studies: The Agricultural Health Study (AHS), The Sister Study, and the GuLF Study.

== Awards and honors ==
Sandler received a NIH Director's Award in 2009 for developing the Sister Study. In 2010, Sandler received the U.S. Environmental Protection Agency Office of Research and Development Honor Award, a Bronze Medal team award. She was selected NIEHS DIR Scientist of the Year in 2010. Sandler received an NIH Director's Award in 2011 for her work in developing the GuLF STUDY. She was elected as a fellow of the American College of Epidemiology, a member of the American Epidemiological Society, and an alumni member of the Alpha chapter of the Delta Omega public health honor society. The American College of Epidemiology presented her with its Leadership and Distinguished Service Award and its Leadership Recognition. In 2015, Sandler received the Dr. Nathan Davis Award for Outstanding Government Service.

She is a past president of the American College of Epidemiology.
