= Third-hand smoke =

Air pollutants that linger in an environment after smoking stops

Third-hand smoke (THS) is contamination by tobacco smoke that lingers following the extinguishing of a cigarette, cigar, or other combustible tobacco product. First-hand smoke refers to the smoke inhaled by the person who smokes. Passive smoke, or second-hand smoke, is a mixture of exhaled smoke and other substances leaving the smoldering end of the cigarette that enters the atmosphere and can be inhaled by others. Third-hand smoke or "THS" is a neologism coined by a research team from the Dana–Farber/Harvard Cancer Center, where "third-hand" is a reference to the smoking residue on surfaces after "passive smoke" has cleared out.

These residual compounds can accumulate on furniture, clothing and dust, where they may persist for long periods even after ventilation or standard cleaning. Humans may subsequently be exposed to THS through inhalation, skin contact, or ingestion of contaminated particles and dust. Infants and young children are considered particularly vulnerable because they frequently crawl on contaminated surfaces, place their hands and objects in their mouths, and have developing systems.

Research has associated THS exposure with respiratory problems, asthma, DNA damage, inflammatory responses, impaired wound healing, and potential developmental effects, although many long-term effects in humans remain under investigation. Studies have also shown that tobacco-specific carcinogens such as NNK can persist in indoor environments and on fabrics long after smoking has ceased.

== Exposure and health effects ==
Humans can be exposed to THS through inhalation, skin contact, or ingestion. Many common surfaces can accumulate THS compounds, including furnishings, walls, flooring, and clothes. THS is thought to potentially cause more harm to infants and young children because younger children are more likely to put their hands in their mouths or be cuddled up to a smoker with toxins on their skin and clothes. Infants also crawl on the floor and eat from their hands without washing them first, ingesting the toxins into their still-developing respiratory and immune systems.

According to a study conducted by Northrup, 22% of infants and children are exposed to SHS/THS in their homes each year, comprising a major proportion of the 126 million nonsmokers exposed to harmful tobacco products annually.

Though research is limited, many harmful health effects have been linked to THS exposure. THS has the potential to impair wound healing by altering the body's natural anti-inflammatory response, remodel respiratory structure due to increased collagen deposits in airways, and cause permanent damage to DNA. Other health effects include asthma, increased cough morbidity, and other respiratory conditions. If pregnant mothers are exposed to THS, it can slow fetal lung development in the third trimester. In children, THS exposure has also been linked to sudden infant death syndrome (SIDS) as a potential cause factor, and has also been linked to cognitive and memory deficits in growing children. Whether or not these largely theoretical relationships are causal in humans at realistic exposure levels remains to be seen.

Third-hand smoke has also been tested in various cell assays. THS exposure by cells has been shown to lead to the observation of DNA strand breaks, inhibition of proliferation, and cell death. Acrolein has shown to be a particularly potent third-hand smoke gas.

A study led by Ashley Merianos, a tobacco researcher at the University of Cincinnati, revealed that in homes where children live, surfaces were contaminated with nicotine and the tobacco-specific carcinogen NNK. This was observed even in homes with voluntary indoor smoking bans, highlighting the persistent nature of THS pollutants. The study revealed higher levels of NNK and nicotine in lower-income households and homes that do not ban indoor smoking. Residential field studies have found that third-hand smoke accumulates in smokers' homes and remains even after the smokers move out, including after long periods of vacancy and standard cleaning. Nonsmoking adults and children who move into such homes have been observed to have higher nicotine levels on their hands and higher urinary cotinine than residents of homes with no history of smoking, indicating continued exposure to THS from contaminated dust, air and surfaces.

== Chemical composition and reservoirs ==
Third-hand smoke and its components have been detected in various indoor environments. The possibility of nitrosamine formation on vehicular surfaces was identified via the spraying of "high but reasonable" levels of nitrous acid (about 4–12 times the levels typically found in homes) onto cellulose substrates and wiping surfaces in a vehicle that had experienced heavy smoking. Similar results were found when cellulose substrates were kept (without wiping) in the vehicle for three days when smoking occurred. Additionally, the persistence of various third-hand smoke components was quantified on wool, cotton, and polyester fibers with THS the most persistent on wool and least persistent on polyester. Washing clothing without detergent was found to remove some THS, though a substantial amount remained after standard laundering.

Because of the growing resolving power and improved detection limits of analytical instruments (sometimes called the "vanishing zero" phenomenon), studies have demonstrated the transport of THS into other spaces via various media. For instance, third-hand smoke signatures have been detected in particles, which can effectively transport such compounds between indoor and outdoor air. Additionally, both gas-phase and aerosol-phase compounds linked to third-hand smoke were detected and quantified in a non-smoking movie theater, possibly via moviegoers' clothes and breath.

Field and laboratory measurements have shown that reduced nitrogen-containing third-hand smoke compounds can partition from contaminated indoor surfaces into the gas phase and subsequently be taken up by aqueous aerosol particles, creating a particle-phase reservoir that allows THS components to persist and be redistributed within indoor air.

Environmental tobacco smoke can oxidize with environmental nitrous acid to create carcinogenic (cancer-causing) tobacco-specific nitrosamines (TSNAs). One TSNA, called 4-(methylnitrosamino)-1-(3-pyridinyl)-1-butanone (also known as nicotine-derived nitrosamine ketone, or NNK), is a potent lung-specific carcinogen ubiquitous in tobacco smoke and smokers' homes, and has been detected on clothing fibers, dust, and in the air. Nitrosamines, along with other tobacco smoke chemicals that are deposited on surfaces or compounds that formed as a result of surface-phase reactions, can be a major source of toxicity, especially for infants. Infants can be particularly adversely affected given their frequent proximity to household surfaces and their propensity to ingest third-hand smoke residue from surfaces and dust.

Review articles have suggested that third-hand smoke-type residues can arise not only from conventional tobacco smoking but also from emissions from e-cigarettes, cannabis and certain illicit substances, with the chemical composition, partitioning behaviour and routes of human exposure depending on the source material and indoor environment.

== Biomarkers of disease ==
It is important to acknowledge the biomarkers of third-hand smoke because they theoretically indicate the severity and presence of disease. In a recent study involving mice, THS biomarkers were discovered after four weeks of initial exposure at equivalent levels to those found in the homes of people who smoke. Researchers used a system that mimicked exposure to humans and sought out biomarkers found in serum, liver, and brain tissues in the mice. The mice were then exposed to THS at varying months and as early as one month, they began to show signs of increased circulating inflammatory cytokines, tumor necrosis factor, granulocyte macrophage colony stimulating factor, and an increase in the stress hormone epinephrine. Damage from THS exposure continued after two, four, and six months. Such damages included oxidative stress and molecular damage. In a small controlled study of healthy nonsmoking adults, acute dermal exposure to third-hand smoke increased urinary biomarkers of oxidative damage to DNA, lipids and proteins and altered the plasma proteome in a pattern similar to that observed in cigarette smokers, including activation of pathways associated with inflammatory skin disease. Some of the mice also became hyperglycemic and hyperinsulinimic, which could mean that insulin resistance could be a consequence of long-term exposure. This study implies that increased exposure time to THS can have dramatic effects. Additional studies with human subjects are still needed to fully understand the implications of THS, as causation remains theoretical and unclear.

== Public awareness and solutions ==
Third-hand smoke is a relatively newly postulated and initially controversial concept, and public awareness of it is lower than that of passive smoke. A 2013 study with six focus groups in metro and rural Georgia (USA) asked participants whether they had heard of THS, most of the participants had not heard about it and did not know what third-hand smoke was. Research on THS is growing, but it does not compare to the 40 years of research on the effects of passive smoke. Yet, it is estimated that 5%-60% of passive smoke-related harm may be attributable to third-hand smoke exposure. THS poses such a risk because its exposure can linger much longer than passive smoke. Third-hand smoke-contaminated surfaces like carpet, walls, and car interiors are also especially hard to clean, whereas passive smoke can be removed with ventilation.

Smoking rates in the United States have fallen considerably from 42.4% in 1965 to 17.8% in 2016. However, the downward trend is slowing, and it is estimated that 23% to 42% of adults in America with low education or living in poverty still smoke. This exposes millions of nonsmokers, many of whom are children.

THS awareness campaigns are growing and primarily focus on the health risks for young children. A 2014 study published in Pediatrics demonstrated that parents are more likely to attempt to quit smoking if they become convinced that third-hand smoke is harmful to children and are more likely to have smoke-free home and car policies if they are aware of the dangers of third-hand smoke. It was recommended for parents to safeguard their children by ensuring they have a smoke-free zone. One such way recommended for smokers to protect family, friends, and others is by smoking outside and showering and changing clothes before coming into contact with others. However, research has shown that parents who are heavy smokers (> 10 cigarettes per day) are less likely to believe that third-hand smoke is harmful to children. Third-hand smoke is one of the issues promoting indoor smoking bans, especially supported by performers such as musicians, who are forced to bring third-hand smoke contamination into their homes through contaminated instruments and cases.

== Fourth- and fifth-hand smoke ==
More controversially, the related concepts of fourth-hand smoke and even fifth-hand smoke have also been proposed as well to refer to further orders of theoretical contamination from tobacco smoke.

== See also ==
- Health effects of tobacco
- Passive smoke
- Tobacco control
- Tar (tobacco residue)
- Junk science
- Fringe science
- The dose makes the poison
