= Takeshi Hirayama =

Japanese epidemiologist (1923–1995)

- 平山 雄
- Born: January 1, 1923; Kyoto, Japan
- Died: October 26, 1995 (aged 72)
- Education: Kyoto University; Johns Hopkins University
- Scientific career
- Institutions: National Institute of Hygiene; National Cancer Center

Takeshi Hirayama (平山 雄, Hirayama Takeshi; January 1, 1923 – October 26, 1995) was a Japanese cancer epidemiologist and anti-tobacco activist who served as the chief of the epidemiology division at the National Cancer Center in Tokyo from 1965 until 1985. He has been credited with publishing the first study linking passive smoking to lung cancer, and also conducted research on the relationship between certain dietary factors and cancer.

== Early life and education ==
Hirayama was born on January 1, 1923, in Kyoto, Japan. When he was three, his father, Tohshi Hirayama, became professor of surgery at Manchuria Medical College, which led to him and his family moving to the city of Harbin in China. Hirayama graduated from Manchuria Medical College in 1945, and received a degree in medical science from Kyoto University in 1951 and a Master of Public Health degree from Johns Hopkins University in 1952.

== Career ==
In 1946, Hirayama moved to Tokyo, where he took a job at the Japanese National Institute of Hygiene. In 1959, he moved to New York City to study the association between tobacco smoking and lung cancer at Memorial Sloan Kettering Cancer Center. In 1965, he was appointed the chief of the epidemiology division at the National Cancer Institute (also known as the National Cancer Centre) in Tokyo. He remained in this position until 1985. Soon afterward, he designed a large cohort study of over 260,000 subjects, known as the "six prefecture" cohort study, which he continued to follow up until he retired. During his career, he became a prominent figure in the anti-smoking movement, and supported many anti-smoking activities by non-governmental organizations.

== Research ==
=== Secondhand smoke ===
In 1981, Hirayama published a study of 265,000 people which found an association between exposure to secondhand smoke and an increased risk of lung cancer. This study has been described as "one of the most frequently cited studies in regulatory proceedings, risk assessments, and the media" with regard to secondhand smoke. It has also been described as the first study linking secondhand smoke to lung cancer in nonsmokers, although two other studies were published around the same time with similar findings. In an attempt to discredit the study and protect their interests, the tobacco industry decided to produce a study of their own, dubbed the "Japanese spousal study", with the aim of fraudulently refuting Hirayama's findings. In addition, the Tobacco Institute responded to Hirayama's 1981 study by writing a letter to his superior criticizing the study, despite knowing that Hirayama's work was absolutely correct. In 1984, Hirayama published a cohort study of 265,118 adults which reached conclusions similar to those of his 1981 study, namely, that non-smoking wives of smoking husbands were at an increased risk of lung cancer and ischemic heart disease.

=== Diet and cancer ===
Hirayama also studied the relationship between green and yellow vegetable consumption and a decreased risk of certain cancers. He also published a number of studies linking increased consumption of meat, eggs, butter, and cheese to an increased risk of breast cancer.

== Honors and awards ==
In 1988 and 1993, Hirayama received the WHO commemorative medal on tobacco or health. In 1989, he received the Ramazzini Award from the Collegium Ramazzini "for his contributions to the knowledge of the role of lifestyle in the genesis of cancer".

== Personal life ==
Hirayama's hobbies included painting and sketching. He died on October 26, 1995. He was survived by his wife, Yukiko, and their two sons.
