= Geoffrey Kabat =

American epidemiologist, cancer researcher, and author

- Education: Haverford College; Columbia University
- Occupations: Epidemiologist; Cancer researcher; Author
- Website: geoffreykabat.com

Geoffrey C. Kabat is an American epidemiologist, cancer researcher, and author. He has been on the faculty of the Albert Einstein College of Medicine and State University of New York, Stony Brook. His work has addressed a wide variety of exposures and their potential causal role in specific cancers. Kabat has studied lifestyle factors (smoking, alcohol, diet, exercise, sleep); reproductive and hormonal factors; anthropometric and metabolic factors (adiposity, height, the metabolic syndrome); and environmental exposures (air pollution, PAHs, pesticides, DDT, glyphosate, and electromagnetic fields). He is also known for his efforts to clarify the actual contribution of certain factors that have received outsized attention in contrast to what is firmly known about the causes of cancer. In 2003, he was co-author of a disputed BMJ study funded by the tobacco industry that found secondhand smoke was not associated with increased mortality. Along with his scientific publications, Kabat has written four books and many articles for general audiences. As of 2019, he was a member of the board of directors of the Science Literacy Project and the board of scientific advisors of the American Council on Science and Health.

== Early life and education ==
Kabat graduated from Haverford College in 1967, majoring in French, and then acquired a PhD in Slavic Languages and Literature from Columbia University. He has stated he got into epidemiology "by chance", partially because health research was much more valued and better funded than research in Russian literature in the mid-1970s.

== Tobacco study ==
In 2003, Kabat, who then worked at the State University of New York, Stony Brook, co-authored a study with James Enstrom in The BMJ examining the association between passive smoking and tobacco-related mortality. The study concluded that its results "do not support a causal relation between environmental tobacco smoke and tobacco related mortality, although they do not rule out a small effect." The study was funded and heavily publicized by the tobacco industry. The paper was heavily criticized by the scientific community. Of the many letters to The BMJ in response to the article, few provided "a dispassionate appraisal" of the work, and the editor of The BMJ stood by its decision to print the paper, assessing it "a useful contribution to an important debate." One criticism was that the study had failed to identify a comparison group of "unexposed" persons due to the pervasive exposure to secondhand smoke in the 1950s. In a US racketeering lawsuit against tobacco companies, the Enstrom and Kabat paper was cited by the US District Court as "a prime example of how nine tobacco companies engaged in criminal racketeering and fraud to hide the dangers of tobacco smoke." The Court found that the study had been funded and managed by the Center for Indoor Air Research, a tobacco industry front group tasked with "offsetting" damaging studies on passive smoking, as well as by Philip Morris who stated that Enstrom's work was "clearly litigation-oriented." On May 22, 2009, a three-judge panel of the U.S. Court of Appeals for the District of Columbia Circuit unanimously upheld the lower court's 2006 ruling.

== Books and articles ==
Kabat has written a number of science articles for general audiences, including articles for the Genetic Literacy Project, Quillette, and Slate. He has also written several books.

=== Books ===
==== Ideology and Imagination ====
Kabat's first book, Ideology and Imagination: The Image of Society in Dostoevsky, was published in 1978. In a review, David Matual described the book as exploring "the complex interrelationship between the imaginative work of a great writer and the social and historical milieu of his creations", and said that the book contained "several excellent and instructive chapters" but "lacks focus".

==== Hyping Health Risks ====
Kabat is also the author of the book Hyping Health Risks, published in 2008 by Columbia University Press. The book examines several alleged environmental health risks, such as the proposed link between artificial chemicals and cancer, and concludes that these risks have been distorted. A 2017 Skeptical Inquirer review says that "Kabat ... helps readers understand relative versus absolute risk, medical research, [and] how pseudoscientific and questionable claims get [mis]reported by news media and activists...."

David A. Savitz reviewed the book and wrote "For the most part, the story of truth and misrepresentation of evidence on health risks [in the book] was engaging". It was also reviewed in the New England Journal of Medicine, where Barbara Gastel wrote that "Kabat is at his best in the chapters in which he presents the case studies," but she criticized the book's first chapter, entitled "Introduction: Toward a Sociology of Health Hazards in Daily Life". Neil Pearce wrote in the International Journal of Epidemiology that he "became more frustrated and less impressed as [he] worked [his] way through the book" and criticized the book for its "lack of balance".

==== Getting Risk Right ====
Kabat's third book, Getting Risk Right: Understanding the Science of Elusive Health Risks, was published in 2016 and builds on the themes in Hyping Health Risks. In his review of Getting Risk Right, Terence Hines wrote that Kabat "more than accomplishes" his goals of understanding how we can make great scientific progress solving some problems while making little headway with others, and why there is often much greater public attention to scientifically questionable claims than to actual scientific progress. Hines said of the chapter reviewing the question of whether cell phones cause cancer, it "alone is worth the price of the book."

Anne Fairbrother's review in Issues in Science and Technology said that although the book's "writing is uneven", it "presents important topics for consideration and four fascinating and well-documented epidemiological case studies". Rick Mathis wrote in Health Affairs that it's an "important book" with an "engaging discussion of the use and misuse of information on health risks", though "at times too technical for the general reader". Both Fairbrother and Mathis highlighted the book's discussion of the important difference between hazard (the potential for harm) and risk (the actual probability of the hazard causing harm in a given situation). In his review for the American Council on Science and Health, Josh Bloom called it "a compelling read", and complimented Kabat's ability "to take complex issues and make them both understandable, easily readable and interesting".

==== Slava ====
His fourth book, Slava: The Life and Words of a Croatian Jew, was published in Croatia.
