= Philip Morris External Research Program =

The Philip Morris External Research Program, sometimes abbreviated as PMERP, was an external research grant program founded in the fall of 2000 by Philip Morris International, as an initiative of the company's Worldwide Scientific Affairs unit. Its stated aim was to "address the concerns of the public health community regarding cigarette smoking". During its eight-year history, it funded about 470 research proposals at 60 different medical schools, and spent about US$200 million. It has been compared to the Center for Indoor Air Research (CIAR); of the six members of PMERP's advisory board, three were affiliated with the CIAR (as of 2005). In addition, a 2001 paper co-authored by Norbert Hirschhorn states that the structure of PMERP's review panel is "nearly identical to that of the CIAR." A 2006 paper analyzing grants awarded by PMERP, and peer-reviewed studies resulting from these grants, concluded that PMERP "appears to exist less as a conduit for critical scientific inquiry than to fit into a corporate strategy intended to burnish PM's public image." In the fall of 2007 Philip Morris shut down the program, with their decision to do so first becoming publicly known in February 2008.
