= Sidestream smoke =

Smoke directly released into the air from a burning cigarette, cigar, or smoking pipe

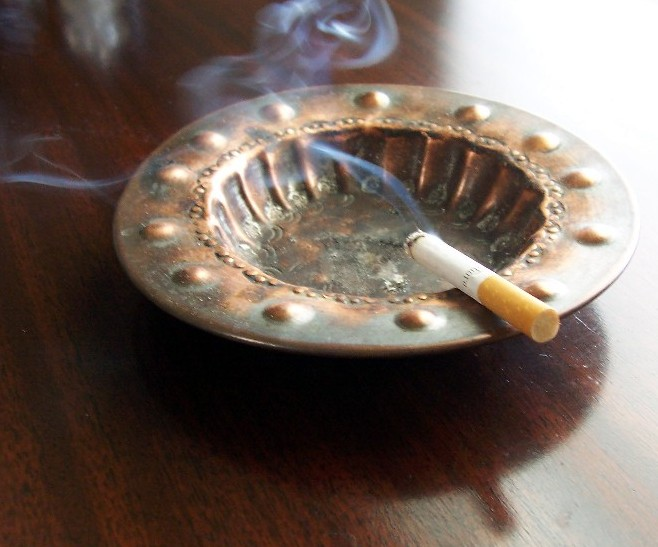
Sidestream smoke being emitted from a lit cigarette

Sidestream smoke is smoke which goes into the air directly from a burning cigarette, cigar, or smoking pipe. Sidestream smoke is the main component (around 85%) of second-hand smoke (SHS), also known as environmental tobacco smoke (ETS) or passive smoke. The relative quantity of chemical constituents of sidestream smoke are different from those of directly inhaled ("mainstream") smoke, although their chemical composition is similar. Sidestream smoke has been classified as a Class A carcinogen by the U.S. Environmental Protection Agency.

== Contents ==
Like mainstream smoke, sidestream tobacco smoke is made up of many components including carbon monoxide, tar, nicotine, ammonia, benzene, cadmium and 4-aminobiphenyl. Some of the other compounds found in sidestream smoke are: vinylchloride, hydrogen cyanide, arsenic, acrolein, acetaldehyde, formaldehyde, catechol, cresol, hydroquinone, lead, methyl ethyl ketone, nitric oxide, phenol, styrene, toluene, and butane. Exposure to sidestream smoke yields higher concentrations of these compounds as well as increased concentrations of carboxyhemoglobin, nicotine, and cotinine in the blood. When comparing sidestream and mainstream condensate, sidestream has 2–6 times more condensate per gram than mainstream smoke. Due to the incomplete combustion process responsible for the creation of sidestream smoke, there may be exposure to higher concentrations of carcinogens than are typically inhaled directly.

== Risks ==
There are over 250 toxins and carcinogens in cigarette smoke. The risks of developing lung cancer, brain tumors, and acute myeloid leukemia and the incidence of heart disease and benign respiratory diseases increase with the inhalation of sidestream smoke. Additionally, the chance of developing breast cancer and cervical cancer also increases with the inhalation of sidestream smoke.

Evidence has shown that sidestream smoke may be more harmful, per gram, than mainstream smoke. However, sidesmoke is inhaled in far lesser amounts than mainstream smoke in people who smoke tobacco.

The relative risk of cardiovascular disease is 1.2–1.3 with exposure to sidestream smoke due to the cyanide present in the smoke. There is also evidence that sidestream smoke causes negative effects in children, both behaviorally and cognitively. One study found that higher levels of cotinine in children were correlated with a decreased ability to perform in reading and math.

Factors such as age, gender and different occupations put a person at risk for bladder cancer - smoking is the only other known risk. 4-aminobiphenyl (4-ABP) is an integral component in tobacco smoke, as well as a risk factor for bladder cancer. Sidestream smoke puts individuals at an increased risk of bladder cancer because the 4-ABP concentrations are over ten times that of mainstream smoke.

== Social effects ==
A non-smoker who is inhaling sidestream or second-hand smoke has a 30% greater risk of getting lung cancer at some point in their lives. Exposure to second hand or sidestream smoke has been associated with people who have not smoked before.

The US Environmental Protection Agency estimates sidestream smoke causes approximately 3,000 lung cancer deaths and 62,000 deaths from heart disease in non-smokers every year in the United States.

== Children ==
A child's exposure to contaminants in the air can have detrimental health effects including heightened risk of respiratory tract infections, increased likelihood of childhood asthma, behavioural problems and reduced neurocognitive abilities. Exposure to mainstream and sidestream smoke in childhood poses an increased risk of coughing, wheezing, and mucus production. Studies on rats have shown that those who were exposed to sidestream smoke while in utero and following the period directly after, had differences in airway sensitivity in comparison to those that had been exposed to sidestream smoke only while in utero or only following the period after.

== Test tubes ==
A reduction in glutathione levels was observed following exposure to sidestream smoke in vitro. Glutathione is an antioxidant which resides in the lung after development. Exposure to sidestream smoke for as little as twenty minutes can lead to an increase in contaminant particles within human small airway epithelial cells (SAEC). Cells exposed to sidestream smoke experienced oxidative stress, which further allowed for DNA damage as well as cell transformation and an uncontrolled cell proliferation. Such DNA mutations and uncontrolled cell division resulting from exposure to sidestream smoke may result in cancerous tumours.

== Toxicological experiments ==
During the 1980s the Philip Morris Tobacco Company carried out research on sidestream smoke at the Institut für Biologische Forschung, although this was not voluntarily published. This study found that sidestream smoke is nearly four times more toxic than mainstream smoke per metric gramme. They also found that sidestream condensate was nearly three times more toxic than mainstream smoke as well as 2–6 times more tumourigenic per gram than mainstream condensate when applied to the skin of a mouse; results also showed that sidestream smoke hinders an animal's ability to reach a weight that is considered normal. The research team concluded that the only way to protect oneself from sidestream smoke was to be in smoke-free public places and workspaces.
