= GuLF Study =

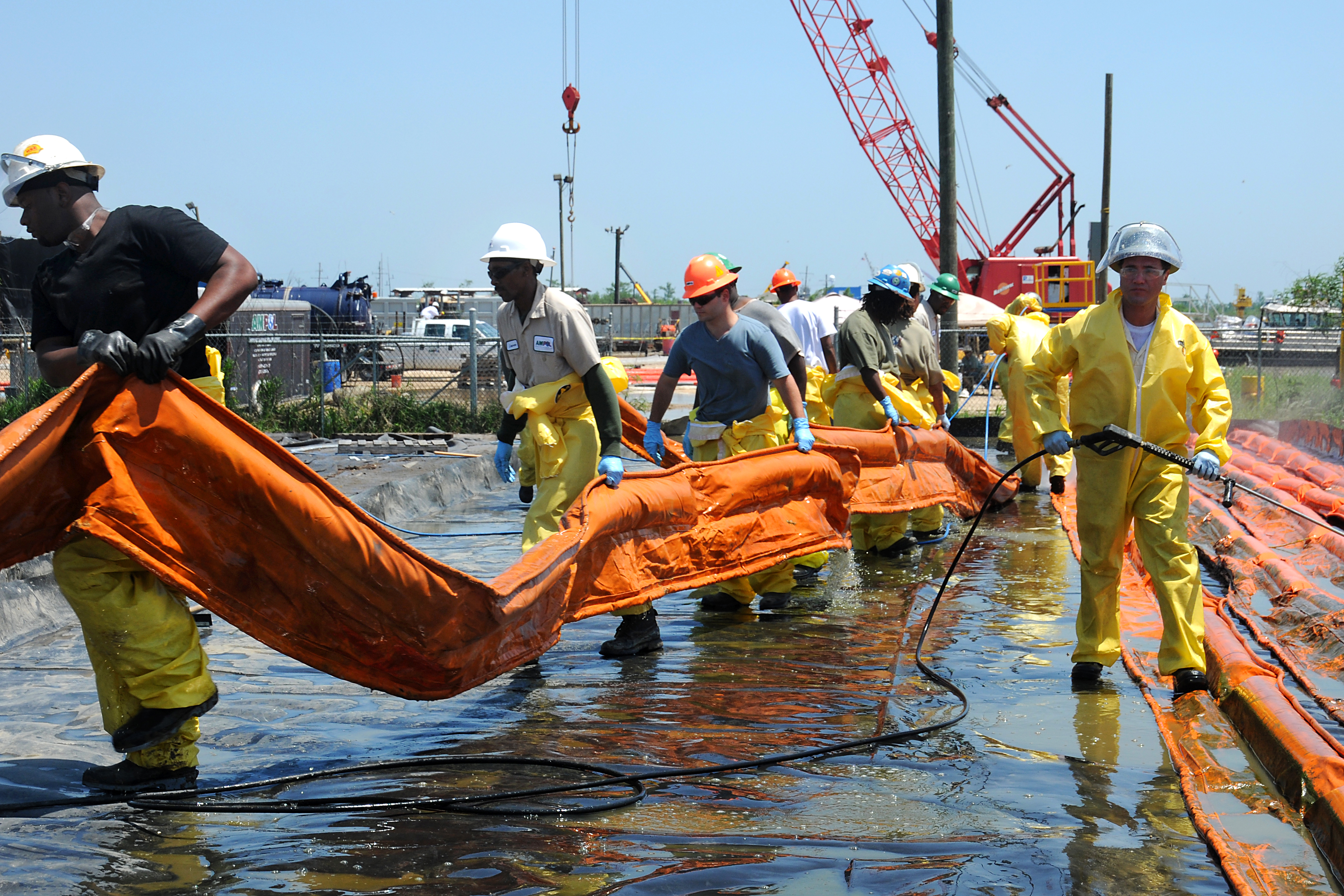
- Workers carry an oil containment boom, Venice, Louisiana, May 2010
- Name of study: Gulf Long-term Follow-up Study
- Initiated by: United States Department of Health and Human Services (HHS), June 2010
- Conducted by: National Institute of Environmental Health Sciences (NIEHS)
- Launched: September 2010
- Principal investigator: Dale Sandler, chief of epidemiology, Division of Intramural Research, NIEHS
- Staff scientist: Richard Kwok, Chronic Disease Epidemiology Group
- Participants: 55,000 clean-up workers

The GuLF Study, or Gulf Long-term Follow-up Study, is a five-year research project examining the human-health consequences of the Deepwater Horizon oil spill in April 2010. The spill followed an explosion on a drilling rig leased by BP, the British oil company, and led to the release of over four million barrels of oil into the Gulf of Mexico, 48 miles off the coast of Louisiana in the United States.

The study was set up in June that year by the United States Department of Health and Human Services. It is being conducted by the National Institute of Environmental Health Sciences (NIEHS), part of the National Institutes of Health, and aims to recruit 55,000 of the 150,000 workers who volunteered or were employed to help clean up the spill. It is led by Dale Sandler, head of the NIEHS's epidemiology branch.

== Deepwater Horizon oil spill ==
Deepwater Horizon oil spill
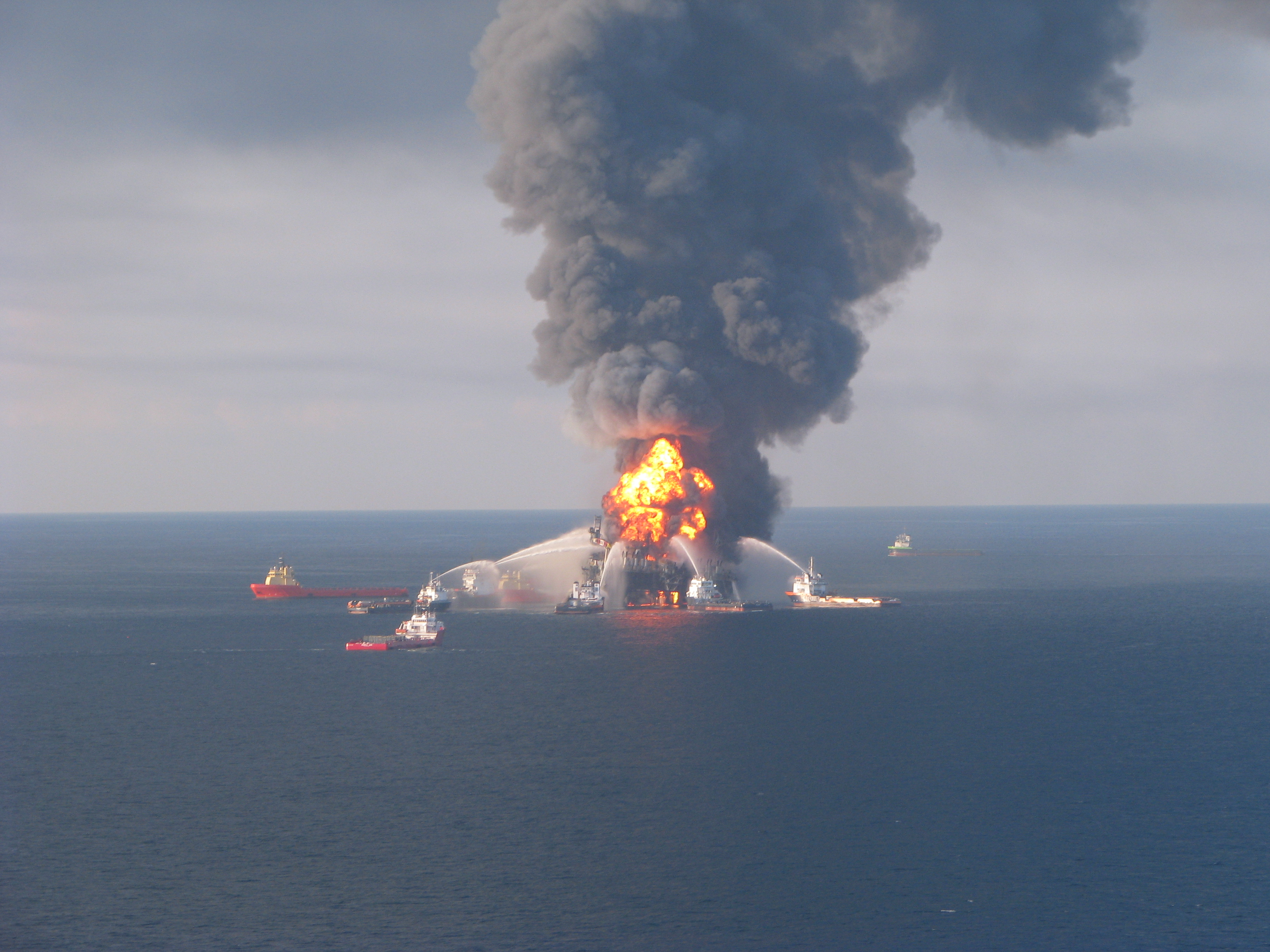
- Fire crews tackle the blaze on the Deepwater Horizon oil rig, April 21, 2010.
- Name of drilling rig: Deepwater Horizon
- Date of explosion: April 20, 2010
- Location of explosion: Macondo Prospect, near Louisiana, Gulf of Mexico
- Companies involved: BP, Halliburton, Transocean
- Areas affected: Alabama, Florida, Louisiana, Mississippi
- Barrels of oil spilled: 4.9 million (some was recovered: 4.1 million (170 million US gallons or 643 million litres) agreed between the parties)
- Spill depth: 5,000 ft (1,500 m)
- Dispersant used: Nine million litres of Corexit 9527 and 9500

The Deepwater Horizon oil spill was the world's largest accidental marine oil spill. It began on April 20, 2010, after an explosion on the Deepwater Horizon, a drilling rig leased by BP to drill an exploratory well. Between then and July 15, when the well was capped, over four million barrels of oil (around 170 million US gallons, or 643 million litres) spilled from a depth of 5,000 ft (1,500 m) into the Gulf of Mexico, 48 miles off the coast of Louisiana.

According to the GuLF Study, the duration of the spill, the area affected, the proximity to local communities, and the number of people involved in the clean-up, were all greater than in any other spill that has been studied. Around 180 miles of shoreline were "heavily to moderately oiled," according to a US government report. Additional safety concerns were raised by the use of roughly nine million litres of oil dispersants, Corexit 9527 and 9500, during the clean-up operation. It was the largest known application of such dispersants to date, and the first use of dispersants at that depth.

== Study details ==
=== Background and funding ===
Following the spill, there were anecdotal reports of health problems among workers involved in the clean-up, who complained of a variety of issues, including flu-like symptoms, rashes and stress. The Institute of Medicine held a workshop in June 2010, "Assessing the Human Health Effects of the Gulf of Mexico Oil Spill," and recommended that the United States government set up a study. The Department of Health and Human Services agreed that month to set it up. The study was launched in September 2010, and in February 2011 the first mailing requests were sent out to potential participants.

The study is expected to cost $34 million over five years, and has been designed so that it can continue for up to 20 years. The National Institutes of Health (NIH) contributed $10 million to fund the initial phases, and BP contributed an additional $10 million to NIH for this and other projects. The BP funding was made through its Gulf of Mexico Research Initiative (GRI), a ten-year program to study the effects of the spill.

=== Focus ===
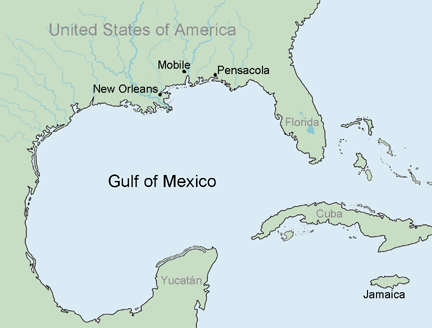
Over four million barrels of oil spilled into the Gulf of Mexico.

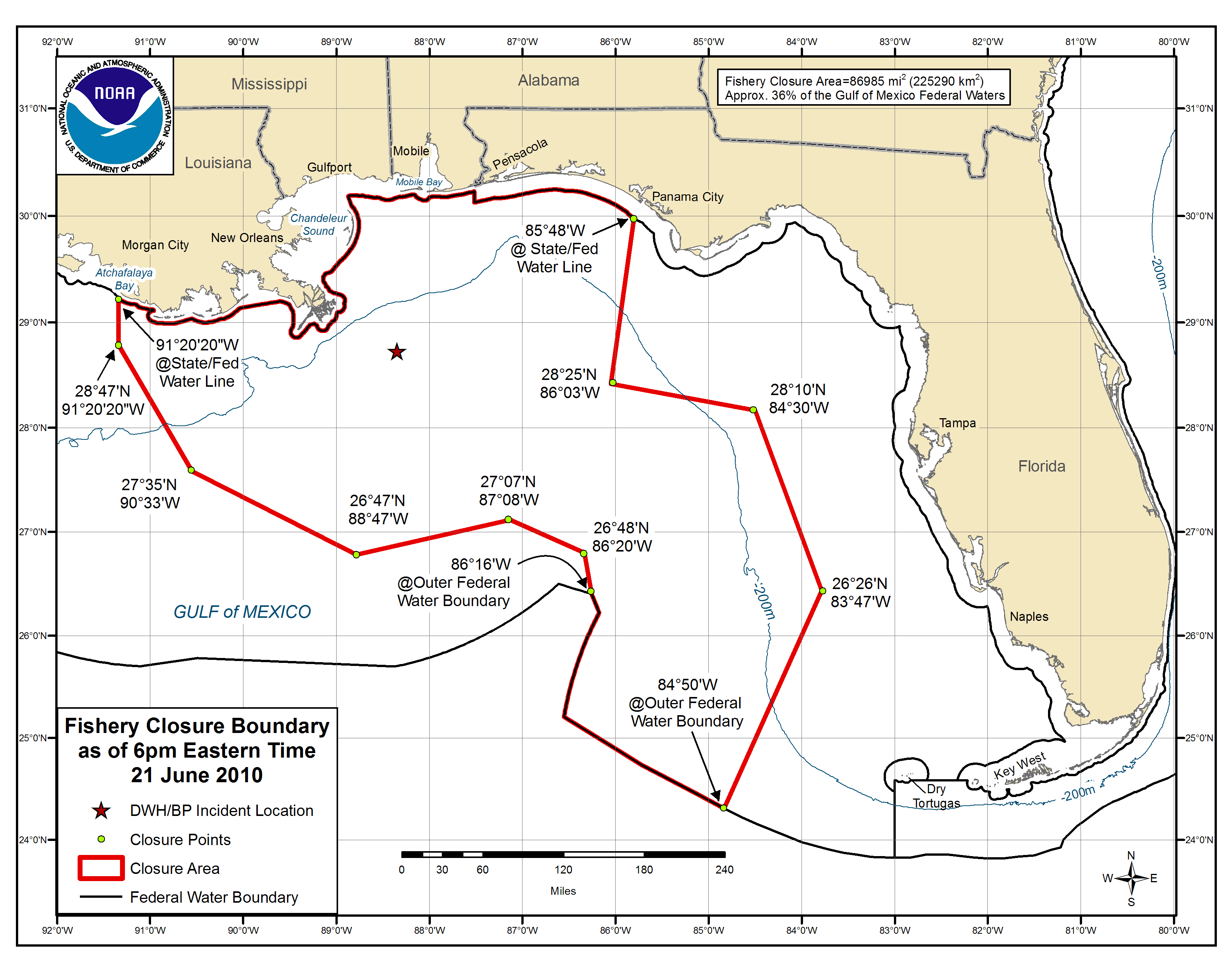
Map of the spill area

The areas affected are Alabama, Florida, Louisiana and Mississippi. The study aims to track 55,000 workers for at least five years. The workers will have been involved in a variety of tasks, such as oil burning, skimming, booming, as well as cleaning up animals, equipment and the shoreline, resulting in different levels of exposure to contaminants. The study has also recruited, as a control group, workers who completed the clean-up safety training, but who in the end did not take part in the clean-up itself.

The researchers will examine the workers' exposure to volatile organic compounds (VOCs), polycyclic aromatic hydrocarbons (PAHs) and dispersants, using monitoring data gathered during the clean-up. Around 20,000 of the workers will be visited at home, and blood, hair, urine and toenail samples will be collected to look for biomarkers, such as DNA adducts and chromosome damage; lung-function tests will be carried out, and dust samples will be collected from their homes.

Researchers will look for respiratory conditions, cancers, hematological outcomes, and neuro-behavioral or mental-health problems, and for any job losses, and financial or domestic disruption, the spill may have caused. Questionnaires ask workers about their health at the time of the spill, exposure to oil or dispersant, and lifestyle factors that, as the study said, "might confound associations between exposures and health." By January 2013 researchers had conducted 32,000 telephone interviews, including 800 interviews in Spanish and over 1,000 in Vietnamese, and 9,967 home visits.

=== Obstacles and concerns ===
The difficulties facing the study are considerable. Sara Reardon wrote in Science in March 2011 that scientists were concerned that they did not know what to look for. The delay between the workers' exposure in 2010 and the start of the study – the first interviews of participants took place in February 2011 – meant that short-term physical markers that could be directly related to the spill, such as rashes, had gone. There is also little information about the pre-spill baseline health of the workers, whose work involves regular exposure to environmental hazards. According to epidemiologist Maureen Lichtveld, the main health effects are likely to be psychosocial, such as depression and increased alcohol use resulting from job losses. Reardon wrote that, given how economically depressed the community is, it will be difficult to demonstrate what is causing the stress-related illnesses the workers report.

There has been concern that the study will collect health information without addressing the medical needs of the workers, who may have no health insurance. The study's lead investigator, Dale Sandler, said in 2011 that participants who are found by the researchers to need medical care will be referred to local health-care providers who offer free or reduced-cost treatment. Local people say that finding such medical care is not easy, and that the workers' health should be prioritized over data collection.

The Impact Study 2023

The Gulf of Mexico were still feeling the disastrous effects of the Deepwater Horizon oil spill of April 2010. Marsh grass retained plant-smothering oil, and the soil continued to crumble away at a faster rate than before the spill, causing the shoreline to retreat more rapidly than it would otherwise, a new study showed
