= James Repace =

Biophysicist and scientific consultant

James L. Repace
- Born: James L. Repace
- Education: Polytechnic Institute of Brooklyn (B.Sc., M.Sc.)
- Occupations: Biophysicist, scientific consultant
- Known for: Research on passive smoking, secondhand smoke exposure, and indoor air quality
- Scientific career
- Fields: Biophysics, environmental health, indoor air quality
- Workplaces: Naval Research Laboratory; United States Environmental Protection Agency; Tufts University School of Medicine

James L. Repace was a Maryland-based biophysicist and scientific consultant known for publishing research on passive smoking. Born 1938, died 2026.

== Education ==
Repace received his B.Sc. in 1962 and his M.Sc. in 1968, both in physics and both from the Polytechnic Institute of Brooklyn.

== Career ==
Repace served as a research physicist at the Naval Research Laboratory in the Ocean Sciences and Electronics Divisions, 1968 - 1979. He worked in the Office of Air and Radiation of the Environmental Protection Agency from 1979 to 1998. While there, he served on both the Air Policy and Indoor Air Staffs, as well as in the Exposure Analysis Division of the Office of Research and Development. He served as a consultant to the Occupational Safety and Health Administration in the U.S. Department of Labor, 1994–1995, on its proposed rule to regulate secondhand smoke and indoor air quality. He served as a Visiting Assistant Clinical Professor at the Tufts University School of Medicine from 2003 to 2011. He also served as a consultant to the Stanford University Dept. of Civil & Environmental Engineering from 2006 to 2012.

One of Repace's most prominent conclusions was that ventilation systems are ineffective at combating indoor secondhand smoke. In one study, Repace and associates surreptitiously took air quality measurements at restaurants in Delaware prior to and after a statewide smoking ban went into effect. In another study, Repace found that displacement ventilation systems in restaurants with smoking and non-smoking sections did not keep airborne particulate matter to an acceptably low level in the non-smoking section, and were far less effective than a smoking ban. He is the author of a nonfiction book: Enemy No. 1 Waging The War On Secondhand Smoke.
