= Stephanie J. London =

American physician

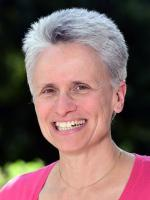
- Education: Harvard University
- Scientific career
- Fields: Epidemiology, environmental health
- Workplaces: Keck School of Medicine of USC; National Institute of Environmental Health Sciences

Stephanie J. London is an American epidemiologist and physician-scientist specializing in environmental health, respiratory diseases, and genetic susceptibility. She is the deputy chief of the epidemiology branch at the National Institute of Environmental Health Sciences.

== Education ==
London earned a B.A. from Harvard College, an M.D. from Harvard Medical School, an M.P.H in Occupational Health and Dr.P.H. in Epidemiology from the Harvard T.H. Chan School of Public Health. Her 1989 dissertation was titled Risk Factors for Breast Cancer in the Nurses' Health Study. She completed a residency in Internal Medicine at the Massachusetts General Hospital. London is licensed in California, and is Board Certified in both Internal Medicine and in Preventive Medicine, with Specialty in Occupational and Environmental Medicine.

== Career ==
London was an assistant professor in the department of preventive medicine at the Keck School of Medicine of USC before coming to National Institute of Environmental Health Sciences (NIEHS) in 1995. She is currently (2021) a principal investigator at NIEHS with a dual appointment in the epidemiology branch and laboratory of respiratory biology. Dale Sandler is the Chief and she is the deputy chief of the epidemiology branch at the National Institute of Environmental Health Sciences.

=== Research ===
The genetics, environment & respiratory disease group, headed by London, focuses on environmental causes, genetic susceptibility and interactions in relation to nonmalignant respiratory conditions.

London began work on genetic susceptibility to respiratory disease in 1990 with a population-based case-control study of lung cancer in African-Americans and Caucasians in Los Angeles County. With collaborators on a cohort of Shanghai men she published the first example of gene-diet interaction based on a dietary biomarker; isothiocyanates, a chemopreventive substance in Brassica vegetables, were protective for lung cancer only among individuals with genetically reduced ability to eliminate these compounds.

London now focuses on nonmalignant respiratory outcomes. In the early 1990s, she was part of the small group of investigators at the University of Southern California that established the landmark Children's Health Study, a school-based cohort study of health effects of air pollution. After coming to NIEHS in 1995, she developed a case-parent triad study of genetics of childhood asthma in Mexico City (MCCAS). Beginning in 2008, London's genetic work shifted to genome-wide approaches. She published one of the first genome wide association studies (GWAS) of asthma in MCCAS. She has integrated MCCAS into various consortia to better understand the genetic architecture of asthma.

London collaborates extensively with the Atherosclerosis Risk in Communities Study. Through this collaboration, she established the Pulmonary Working Group within the CHARGE Consortium to study pulmonary function and related phenotypes in adults using GWAS meta-analysis. This work has led to the discovery of numerous novel loci related to pulmonary function and COPD. Under London's direction, the CHARGE Pulmonary Group recently identified over 50 new lung function loci in a large multi-ethnic meta-analysis. London led the first study of any pulmonary phenotype to include interaction with an environmental factor (smoking) using genome-wide data. London has explored other omic platforms in relation to this phenotype. She led the first meta-analysis of multi-ethnic population based studies examining metabolomics in relation to pulmonary function. Her group is leading a meta-analysis of Epigenome Wide Association Studies of pulmonary function within the CHARGE consortium.

London collaborates with Norwegian investigators to study early life factors in relation to asthma and allergies within the Norwegian Mother and Child (MoBa) pregnancy cohort. London received funding for a seven-year questionnaire in MoBa to identify asthma and allergies at this age when are more reliably ascertained. To extend her asthma findings in MoBa London developed a sub-study of genome wide methylation in newborns using the Illumina 450K platform. Her group published the first study of the effects of any in utero exposure using this platform. This study, now widely replicated, identified numerous novel loci differentially methylated in response to maternal smoking in pregnancy. Motivated by this finding, and as proof of principle for the use of methylation signatures in newborns to identify effects of other in utero exposures and to study potential epigenetic underpinnings of childhood health and disease, London formed an international consortium of birth and childhood cohorts, the Pregnancy and Childhood Epigenetics Consortium (PACE). The first PACE publication combined data on maternal smoking and DNA methylation in offspring from 16 cohorts identifying 6,000 differentially methylated CpGs in newborns, half of them novel and many persisting into childhood.

London also led a larger meta-analysis of personal smoking in adults and methylation in the CHARGE consortium. In a recent publication her group compared methylation signatures from these two meta-analyses and identified genes uniquely differentially methylated in relation to the newborn exposure. Subsequent PACE publications have examined newborn methylation in relation to maternal body mass index during pregnancy, maternal alcohol intake, birthweight, and prenatal air pollution (NO_{2} and particulate matter). A recent PACE publication led by London's group identified numerous loci differentially methylated at birth and childhood in relation to childhood asthma. London co-led a large meta-analysis identifying the extensive newborn methylation signature of gestational age at birth. There are numerous PACE projects underway and the consortium continues to grow.
