= Genevieve Matanoski =

American epidemiologist

Genevieve M. Matanoski is an American epidemiologist and professor at the Johns Hopkins Bloomberg School of Public Health, where she has worked for over 55 years. In 1994, she was the president of the American College of Epidemiology. She has previously managed the official Maryland cancer registry.

She graduated from Radcliffe College. Johns Hopkins School of Medicine, and Johns Hopkins Bloomberg School of Public Health.

== Research ==
Matanoski is known for researching potential risk factors for cancer, such as radiation, dioxins, and butadiene. She has also researched the relationship between X-rays and the risk of heart disease. In 1998, it was reported that she had received $2.3 million in grants from the tobacco industry-funded Center for Indoor Air Research.
