= James Enstrom =

American epidemiologist

James Eugene Enstrom
- Born: Alhambra, California
- Education: Harvey Mudd College, Stanford University, University of California, Los Angeles
- Scientific career
- Fields: Physics, epidemiology
- Workplaces: University of California, Los Angeles
- Thesis: Measurement of the two photon decay of the symbol for the neutral K meson (1970)
- Doctoral advisor: Melvin Schwartz

James Eugene Enstrom (born c. 1943) is an American epidemiologist who has worked at the University of California, Los Angeles since 1976, where he is currently a retired researcher.

== Education ==
Enstrom received his B.S. in physics from Harvey Mudd College, where he graduated co-valedictorian of the Class of 1965; he received his M.S. and Ph.D., also in physics, from Stanford University in 1967 and 1970, respectively. His dissertation advisor was Nobel Laureate Melvin Schwartz and his elementary particle physics dissertation is posted on a Stanford website. During 1971-1973 he conducted postdoctoral research in physics in Group A at Lawrence Berkeley National Laboratory, under the direction of Nobel Laureate Luis Alvarez and Professor Arthur Rosenfeld. He became interested in epidemiology in 1972 when he noticed a National Cancer Institute map that showed Utah with the lowest cancer death rate of any state in the United States. In 1973 he was able to initiate an epidemiological study of Cancer Mortality Among Mormons, who comprised 70% of the Utah population. This subsequently led to his Celeste Durant Rogers Postdoctoral Fellowship in Cancer Research during 1973-1976 at the University of California, Los Angeles. In 1976 he obtained an M.P.H. in epidemiology and a Postdoctoral Certificate in cancer epidemiology under the direction of renowned UCLA School of Public Health Dean Lester Breslow.

== Research ==
In 1975, Enstrom published a study which found that Mormons in California had lower cancer rates than did other Californians. This study, like several subsequent studies by Enstrom, was funded by the American Cancer Society (ACS), but in 1992, the society decided to stop funding his research, leading him to reluctantly turn to the tobacco industry for funding. In 2008, he published a study, along with Lester Breslow, which found that Mormons had longer life expectancies than non-Mormons.

=== BMJ study and controversy ===
In 1996, Enstrom requested that the tobacco industry provide him with funds to conduct research into the health effects of passive smoking. From 1997 to 1998, he received three tobacco industry grants, the combined value of which was $700,000; most of this money was dedicated to his study on passive smoking. This study, published in BMJ in 2003, concluded that "The association between exposure to environmental tobacco smoke and coronary heart disease and lung cancer may be considerably weaker than generally believed." This study used data from one of the American Cancer Society's databases, which Enstrom had requested and received from the society. Michael Thun of the American Cancer Society criticized Enstrom for not informing the ACS that he had requested or received funding from the tobacco industry. In September 2006, the ACS sent the University of California, Los Angeles a letter charging Enstrom with misrepresenting scientific evidence to deny that passive smoking was harmful.

In 2006, prosecutors in a federal racketeering case filed documents which stated that Enstrom had received $94,500 from the tobacco industry between 1992 and 1997. The following year, the judge in this case, Gladys Kessler, ruled that major tobacco companies were guilty of racketeering and misleading the public regarding the dangers of second-hand smoke, citing the paper co-authored by Enstrom in the BMJ as evidence of this.

== Termination ==
In 2010, the University of California, Los Angeles School of Public Health announced that it would not be rehiring Enstrom because it felt his research was "not aligned with the academic mission" of their department. In 2012, Enstrom filed a lawsuit in federal court against UCLA in response to them terminating his position there. The suit was represented by David A. French of the Foundation for Individual Rights in Education. In the suit, Enstrom said that UCLA administrators "discriminated against Dr. Enstrom based on his ideological and political affiliations and sought to purge an academic dissenter from their ranks." In 2015, the case was settled, with UCLA allowing Enstrom to use the title "retired researcher" and continue to access university resources. Enstrom said that he was not entirely satisfied with the settlement, but he believed it was the best compromise that could have been reached in the case. Enstrom said, “I am a good scientist, a very honest scientist. If I didn’t fight I could have disappeared.”

Enstrom founded the Scientific Integrity Institute for the purpose of complementing Enstrom's own research, and serves as its president.
