= Cotinine =

Alkaloid found in tobacco

Clinical data
- Routes of administration: Oral, Smoked, Insufflation
- ATC code: none

Legal status
- Legal status: In general: ℞ (Prescription only)

Pharmacokinetic data
- Elimination half-life: 20 hours

Identifiers
- IUPAC name: (5S)-1-methyl-5-(3-pyridyl)pyrrolidin-2-one
- CAS Number: 486-56-6
- PubChem CID: 854019
- ChemSpider: 746405
- UNII: K5161X06LL
- ChEMBL: ChEMBL578211
- CompTox Dashboard (EPA): DTXSID1047576
- ECHA InfoCard: 100.006.941

Chemical and physical data
- Formula: C_{10}H_{12}N_{2}O
- Molar mass: 176.219 g·mol^{−1}
- 3D model (JSmol): Interactive image
- SMILES: O=C2N(C)[C@H](c1cnccc1)CC2
- InChI: InChI=1S/C10H12N2O/c1-12-9(4-5-10(12)13)8-3-2-6-11-7-8/h2-3,6-7,9H,4-5H2,1H3/t9-/m0/s1; Key:UIKROCXWUNQSPJ-VIFPVBQESA-N

Cotinine is an alkaloid found in tobacco and is also the predominant metabolite of nicotine, typically used as a biomarker for exposure to tobacco smoke. Cotinine is currently being studied as a treatment for depression, post-traumatic stress disorder (PTSD), schizophrenia, Alzheimer's disease and Parkinson's disease. Cotinine was developed as an antidepressant as a fumaric acid salt, cotinine fumarate, to be sold under the brand name Scotine, but it was never marketed.

Similarly to nicotine, cotinine binds to, activates, and desensitizes neuronal nicotinic acetylcholine receptors, though at much lower potency in comparison. It has demonstrated nootropic and antipsychotic-like effects in animal models. Cotinine treatment has also been shown to reduce depression, anxiety, and fear-related behavior as well as memory impairment in animal models of depression, post-traumatic stress disorder, and Alzheimer's disease. Nonetheless, treatment with cotinine in humans was reported to have no significant physiologic, subjective, or performance effects in one study, though others suggest that this may not be the case.

Because cotinine is the main metabolite to nicotine and has been shown to be pharmacologically active, it has been suggested that some of nicotine's effects in the nervous system may be mediated by cotinine and/or complex interactions with nicotine itself.

== Pharmacology ==
A few studies indicate that the affinity for cotinine to the nicotinic acetylcholine receptors (nAChRs) is about 100 times lower than nicotine's. Some work suggests that cotinine may be a positive allosteric modulator of α7 nAChRs. If this is true, cotinine would facilitate endogenous neurotransmission without directly stimulating nAChRs.

=== Pharmacokinetics ===
Cotinine has an in vivo half-life of approximately 20 hours, and is typically detectable for several days (up to one week) after the use of tobacco. The level of cotinine in the blood, saliva, and urine is proportionate to the amount of exposure to tobacco smoke, so it is a valuable indicator of tobacco smoke exposure, including secondary (passive) smoke. People who smoke menthol cigarettes may retain cotinine in the blood for a longer period because menthol can compete with enzymatic metabolism of cotinine. African American smokers generally have higher plasma cotinine levels than Caucasian smokers. Males generally have higher plasma cotinine levels than females. These systematic differences in cotinine levels were attributed to variation in CYP2A6 activity. At steady state, plasma cotinine levels are determined by the amount of cotinine formation and the rate of cotinine removal, which are both mediated by the enzyme CYP2A6. Since CYP2A6 activity differs by sex (estrogen induces CYP2A6) and genetic variation, cotinine accumulates in individuals with slower CYP2A6 activity, resulting in substantial differences in cotinine levels for a given tobacco exposure.

=== Detection in body fluids ===
Drug tests can detect cotinine in the blood, urine, or saliva. Salivary cotinine concentrations are highly correlated to blood cotinine concentrations, and can detect cotinine in a low range, making it the preferable option for a less invasive method of tobacco exposure testing. Urine cotinine concentrations average four to six times higher than those in blood or saliva, making urine a more sensitive matrix to detect low-concentration exposure.

Cotinine levels <10 ng/mL are considered to be consistent with no active smoking. Values of 10 ng/mL to 100 ng/mL are associated with light smoking or moderate passive exposure, and levels above 300 ng/mL are seen in heavy smokers — more than 20 cigarettes a day. In urine, values between 11 ng/mL and 30 ng/mL may be associated with light smoking or passive exposure, and levels in active smokers typically reach 500 ng/mL or more. In saliva, values between 1 ng/mL and 30 ng/mL may be associated with light smoking or passive exposure, and levels in active smokers typically reach 100 ng/mL or more. Cotinine assays provide an objective quantitative measure that is more reliable than smoking histories or counting the number of cigarettes smoked per day. Cotinine also permits the measurement of exposure to second-hand smoke (passive smoking).

However, tobacco users attempting to quit with the help of nicotine replacement therapies (i.e., gum, lozenge, patch, inhaler, and nasal spray) will also test positive for cotinine, since all common NRT therapies contain nicotine that is metabolized in the same way. Therefore, the presence of cotinine is not a conclusive indication of tobacco use. Cotinine levels can be used in research to explore the question of the amount of nicotine delivered to the user of e-cigarettes, where laboratory smoking machines have many problems replicating real-life conditions.

Serum cotinine concentration has been used for decades in US population surveys of the Centers for Disease Control and Prevention to monitor tobacco use, to monitor levels and trends in exposure to environmental tobacco smoke, and to study the relationship between tobacco smoke and chronic health conditions. An estimated one in four nonsmokers (approximately 58 million persons) were exposed to secondhand smoke during 2013-2014. Nearly 40% of children aged 3–11 years were exposed as were 50% of non-Hispanic blacks.
