= Passive smoking =

Inhalation of tobacco smoke by nonsmokers

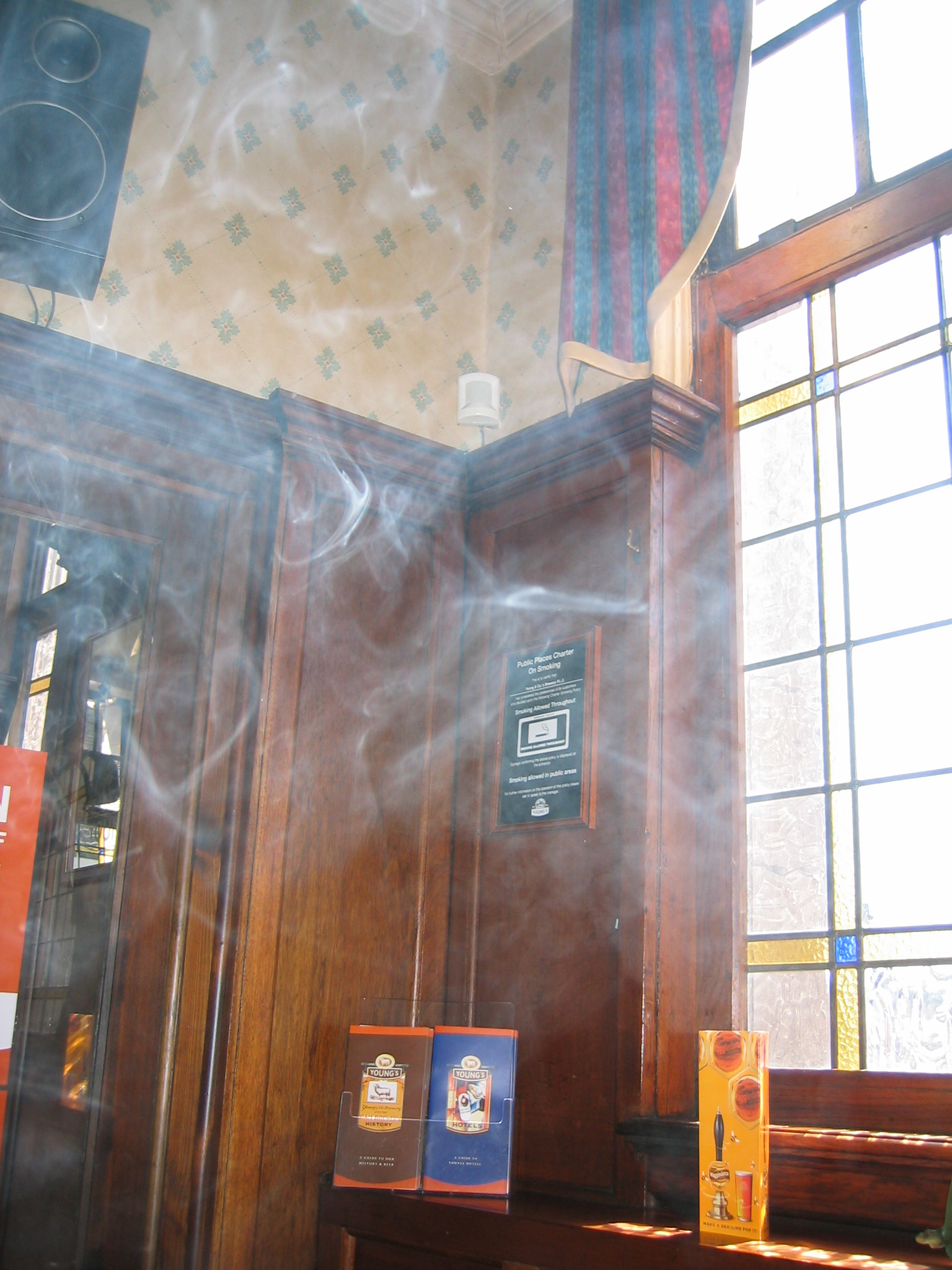
Tobacco smoke in an English pub before a ban came into place in 2007

Passive smoking is the inhalation of tobacco smoke by individuals who are not actively smoking. It occurs when tobacco smoke diffuses into the surrounding atmosphere as an aerosol pollutant, which leads to its inhalation by nearby bystanders within the same environment. Such pollutant is known by various names, including passive smoke, second-hand smoke (SHS) or environmental tobacco smoke (ETS). Exposure causes many of the same health effects caused by active smoking, although at a lower prevalence due to the reduced concentration of smoke that enters the airway.

According to a World Health Organization (WHO) report published in 2023, more than 1.3 million deaths are attributed to passive smoking worldwide every year. The health risks of passive smoke are a matter of scientific consensus, and have been a major motivation for smoking bans in workplaces and indoor venues, including restaurants, bars and night clubs, as well as some open public spaces.

Concerns around passive smoking have played a central role in the debate over the harms and regulation of tobacco products. Since the early 1970s, the tobacco industry has viewed public concern about the health effects of passive smoking as a serious threat to its business interests. Despite the industry's awareness of its harms as early as the 1980s, the tobacco industry coordinated a scientific controversy with the purpose of stopping regulation of their products.

== Terminology ==
Fritz Lickint created the term "passive smoking" ("Passivrauchen") in a publication in the German language during the 1930s. Terms used include "environmental tobacco smoke" to refer to the airborne matter, while "involuntary smoking" and "passive smoking" refer to exposure to second-hand smoke. The term "environmental tobacco smoke" can be traced back to a 1974 industry-sponsored meeting held in Bermuda, while the term "passive smoking" was first used in the title of a scientific paper in 1970.

The Surgeon General of the United States prefers to use the phrase "second-hand smoke" rather than "environmental tobacco smoke", stating that "The descriptor 'second-hand' captures the involuntary nature of the exposure, while 'environmental' does not." Most researchers consider the term "passive smoking" to be synonymous with "second-hand smoke". In contrast, a 2011 commentary in Environmental Health Perspectives argued that research into "thirdhand smoke" renders it inappropriate to refer to passive smoking with the term "second-hand smoke", which the authors stated constitutes a pars pro toto.

The term "sidestream smoke" is sometimes used to refer to smoke that goes into the air directly from a burning cigarette, cigar, or pipe, while "mainstream smoke" refers to smoke that a smoker exhales.

== Health effects ==
Death rate from secondhand smoke

Passive smoke causes many of the diseases caused by direct smoking, including cardiovascular diseases, cancer, and respiratory diseases. It is associated with an overall increased risk of death in both adults and children. A study published in Lancet Public Health concluded that in 2023, exposure to second-hand smoke accounted for about 1.66 million deaths globally and about 44.8 million deaths and disability-adjusted life-years (DALYs). As of 2017, passive smoking causes about 900,000 deaths a year, which is about 1/8 of all deaths caused by smoking.

Passive smoking is a risk factor for lung cancer, and is estimated to cause over 7,000 deaths from lung cancer among non-smokers every year in the US, with three quarters of cases being people that have smoked previously. Similarly, passive smoking has been found to increase the risk of cervical cancer by a review from 2015, and by a 2016 review to significantly increase the risk of bladder cancer.

Second-hand smoke is a significant risk factor for breast cancer in females, as determined by a 2024 review. Historically, research has been less conclusive: the US Surgeon General in 2006 stated that there is "suggestive" evidence for passive smoking increasing the risk of breast cancer in females, but that it was not conclusive enough to assert causation, after the California Environmental Protection Agency found there to exist an increase in risk of 70% in younger, primarily premenopausal, females. Two years prior, in 2004, The IARC had concluded that there was no support for causation in never-smokers. In 2015, a meta-analysis found the evidence for moderate increase to breast cancer risk to have become "more substantial than a few years ago."

Exposure to second-hand smoke worsens existing asthma, allergies, and other respiratory conditions, increases the risks of developing asthma and chronic obstructive pulmonary disease, and has also been found associated with sinusitis. Among children and abdolescents, passive smoking is associated with a slightly higher risk of developing allergies, according to A 2014 systematic review, with evidence being weaker for adults.

Passive smoking may increase the risk of tuberculosis infection and accelerate the progression of the disease, as found by a 2015 meta-analysis, although noting that the evidence is weak. It may also increase the risk of carrying Neisseria meningitidis and Streptococcus pneumoniae, and in children increases the risk of middle ear infections and invasive meningococcal disease. A possible link to periodontitis has been found.

Passive smoking increases the likelihood of heart disease and reduced heart rate variability. Epidemiological studies have shown that passive cigarette smoking increases the risk of atherosclerosis, similarly to active smoking. There is evidence for a correlation of passive smoke exposure with incidence of Type 2 diabetes, but it remains unclear whether the association is causal. There is a strong association with an increased risk of stroke, disproportionately heavily at low levels of exposure. Exposure may also increase the risk of cognitive impairment and dementia in adults 50 and over, and causes children to show reduced vocabulary and reasoning skills when compared with non-exposed children, as well as more general cognitive and intellectual deficits. Exposure is additionally associated with an increased risk of depressive symptoms. A 2016 systematic review and meta-analysis found that passive smoking was associated with a higher rate of atopic dermatitis.

=== Children ===
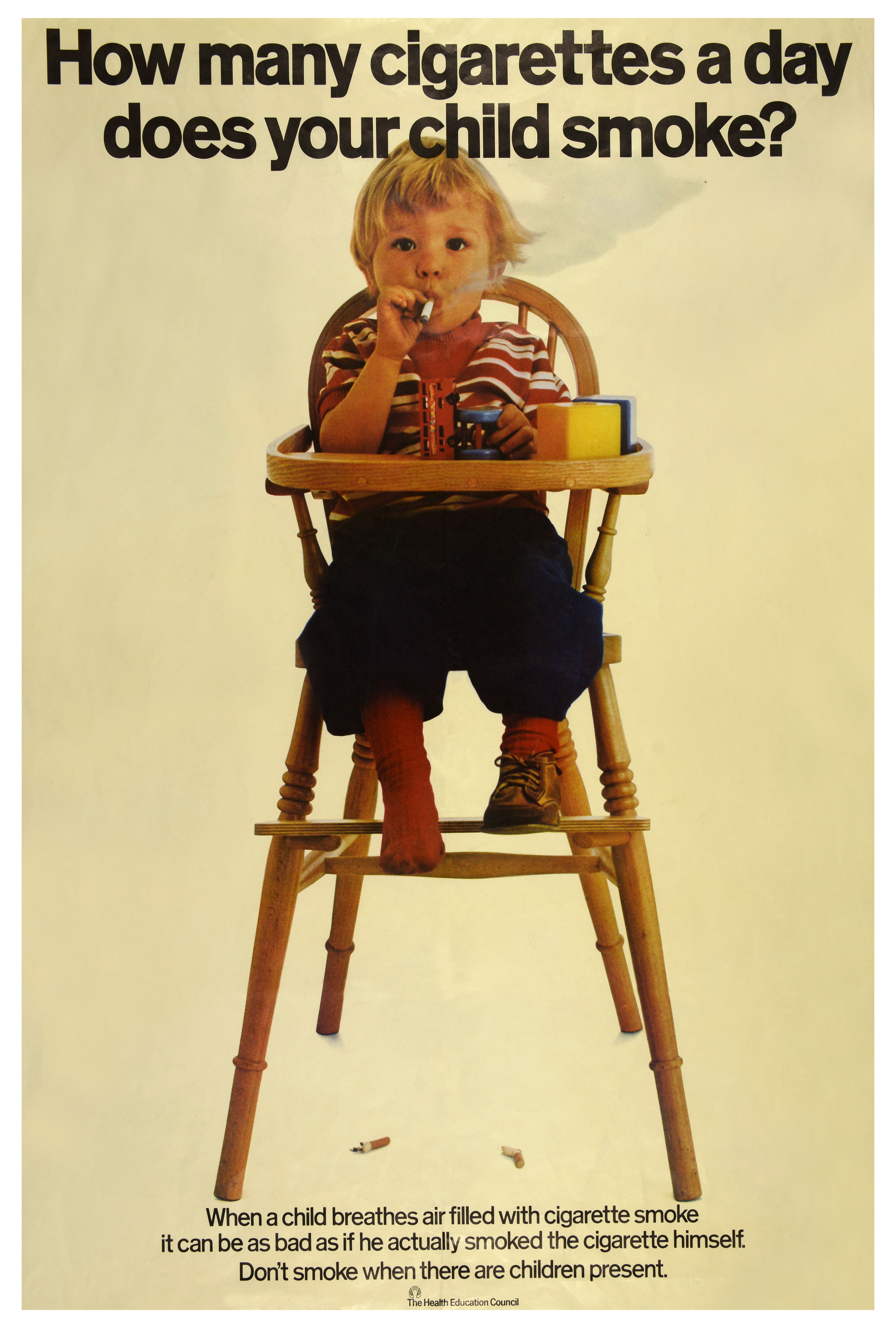
Old prevention poster from New Zealand. "When a child breathes air filled with cigarette smoke it can be as bad as if he actually smoked the cigarette himself."

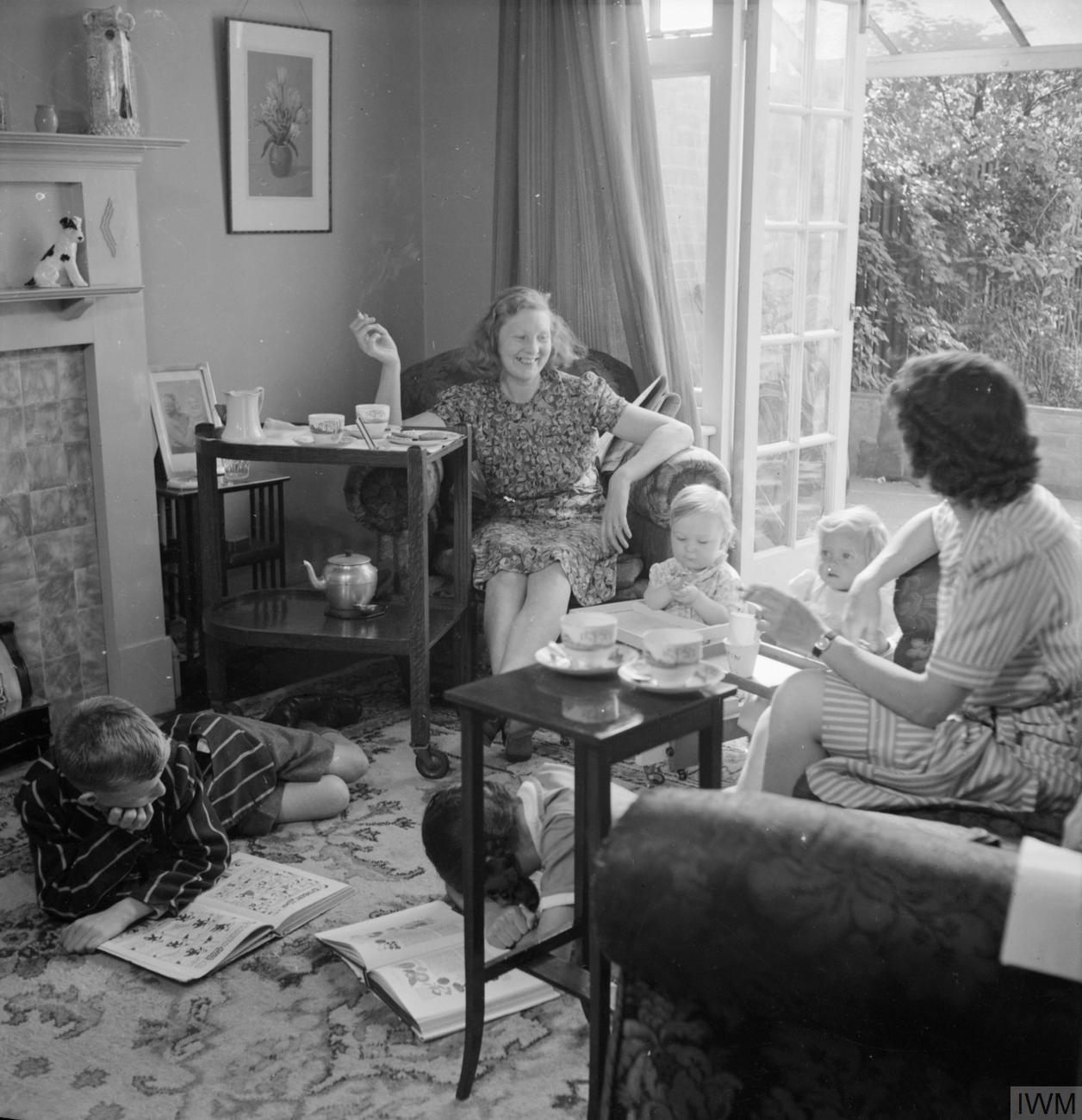
Children playing while their mothers smoke, 1945. Scenes such as this were common before the dangers of passive smoke were widely recognized.

Passive smoking in children carries many of the same adverse effects as in adults, such as those on the cardiovascular system, and increased risks and effects of asthma and allergies. Passive smoke exposure is associated with an almost doubled risk of hospitalization for asthma exacerbation among children with asthma.

Passive smoking increases the risk of lung infections, also including more severe illness with bronchiolitis and bronchitis, and of worse outcome, as well as increasing the risk of developing tuberculosis if exposed to a carrier. In the United States, it is estimated that passive smoke has been associated with between 150,000 and 300,000 lower respiratory tract infections in infants and children under 18 months of age, resulting in between 7,500 and 15,000 hospitalizations each year.

Exposure to second-hand smoke can lead to learning difficulties, developmental delays, executive function problems, and neurobehavioral effects. Animal models suggest a role for nicotine and carbon monoxide in neurocognitive problems.

As of 2015, most studies have found a significant association between passive smoking and sleep disordered breathing in children, but further studies are needed to determine whether this association is causal.

Anesthesia complications and increased chance of some negative surgical outcomes have also been noted.

=== Pregnancy ===
Pregnant females exposed to passive smoke exposure during pregnancy have higher risks of stillbirth and of delivering children of longer lengths, low weights, smaller head circumferences, or with congenital abnormalities such as neural tube defects. Maternal passive smoking increases the risk of non-syndromic orofacial clefts by 50% among their children.

There is evidence for a link between passive smoking and risk of giving premature birth, although the US Surgeon General in 2006 described the evidence of a causal link only as "suggestive". A 2014 meta-analysis found that laws limiting smoking decrease the rate of premature birth. A different 2014 meta-analysis found miscarriage to be 11% more common in exposed females, but did not conclude causation.

Presence of environmental smoke can cause sudden infant death syndrome (SIDS). In his 2006 report, the US Surgeon General concludes that there is evidence "sufficient to infer a causal relationship between exposure to passive smoke and sudden infant death syndrome." Passive smoking has been estimated to be associated with 430 SIDS deaths in the United States annually as of that year.

== Evidence ==
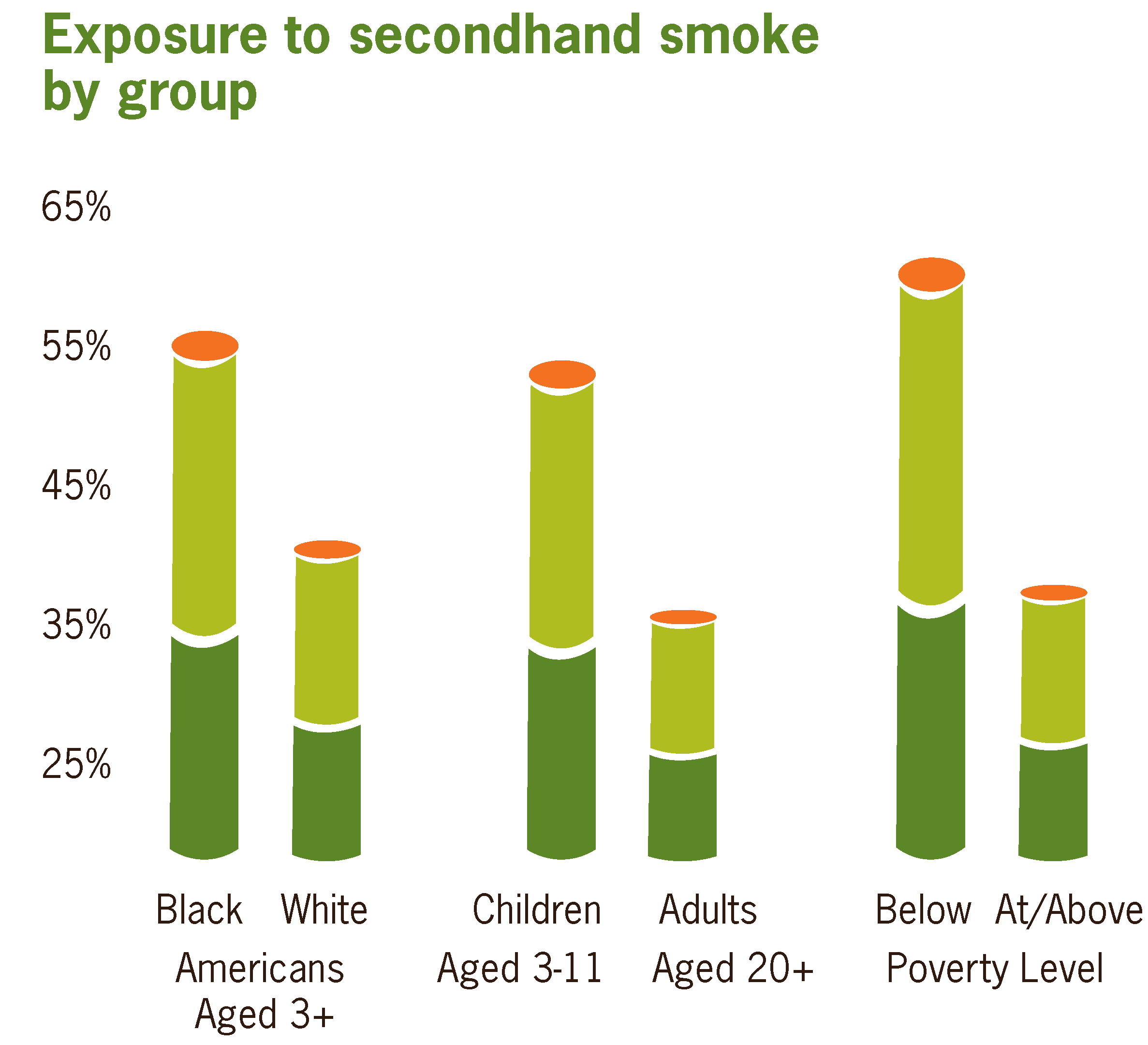
Exposure to passive smoke by age, race, and poverty level in the US in 2010

Epidemiological studies show that non-smokers exposed to passive smoke are at risk for many of the health problems associated with direct smoking.

In 1992, a review estimated that passive smoke exposure was responsible for 35,000 to 40,000 deaths per year in the United States in the early 1980s. The absolute risk increase of heart disease due to ETS was 2.2%, while the attributable risk percent was 23%. A 1997 meta-analysis found that passive smoke exposure increased the risk of heart disease by a quarter, and two 1999 meta-analyses reached similar conclusions.

Evidence shows that inhaled sidestream smoke, the main component of passive smoke, is about four times more toxic than mainstream smoke. This fact has been known to the tobacco industry since the 1980s, though it kept its findings secret. Some scientists believe that the risk of passive smoking, in particular the risk of developing coronary heart diseases, may have been substantially underestimated.

In 1997, a meta-analysis on the relationship between passive smoke exposure and lung cancer concluded that such exposure caused lung cancer. The increase in risk was estimated to be 24% among non-smokers who lived with a smoker. In 2000, Copas and Shi reported that there was clear evidence of publication bias in the studies included in this meta-analysis. They further concluded that after correcting for publication bias, and assuming that 40% of all studies are unpublished, this increased risk decreased from 24% to 15%. This conclusion has been challenged on the basis that the assumption that 40% of all studies are unpublished was "extreme".

In 2006, Takagi et al. reanalyzed the data from this meta-analysis to account for publication bias and estimated that the relative risk of lung cancer among those exposed to passive smoke was 1.19, slightly lower than the original estimate. A 2000 meta-analysis found a relative risk of 1.48 for lung cancer among men exposed to passive smoke, and a relative risk of 1.16 among those exposed to it at work. Another meta-analysis confirmed the finding of an increased risk of lung cancer among women with spousal exposure to passive smoke the following year. It found a relative risk of lung cancer of 1.29 for women exposed to passive smoke from their spouses. A 2014 meta-analysis noted that "the association between exposure to passive smoke and lung cancer risk is well established."

A minority of epidemiologists have found it hard to understand how passive smoke, which is more diluted than actively inhaled smoke, could have an effect that is such a large fraction of the added risk of coronary heart disease among active smokers. One proposed explanation is that passive smoke is not simply a diluted version of "mainstream" smoke, but has a different composition with more toxic substances per gram of total particulate matter. Passive smoking appears to be capable of precipitating the acute manifestations of cardio-vascular diseases (atherothrombosis) and may also have a negative impact on the outcome of patients who have acute coronary syndromes.

In 2004, the International Agency for Research on Cancer (IARC) of the World Health Organization (WHO) reviewed all significant published evidence related to tobacco smoking and cancer. It concluded:

These meta-analyses show that there is a statistically significant and consistent association between lung cancer risk in spouses of smokers and exposure to second-hand tobacco smoke from the spouse who smokes. The excess risk is of the order of 20% for women and 30% for men and remains after controlling for some potential sources of bias and confounding.

Subsequent meta-analyses have confirmed these findings.

The National Asthma Council of Australia cites studies showing that passive smoke is probably the most important indoor pollutant, especially around young children:

- Smoking by either parent, particularly by the mother, increases the risk of asthma in children.
- The outlook for early childhood asthma is less favourable in smoking households.
- Children with asthma who are exposed to smoking in the home generally have more severe disease.
- Many adults with asthma identify ETS as a trigger for their symptoms.
- Doctor-diagnosed asthma is more common among non-smoking adults exposed to ETS than those not exposed. Among people with asthma, higher ETS exposure is associated with a greater risk of severe attacks.

In France, exposure to passive smoke has been estimated to cause between 3,000 and 5,000 premature deaths per year, with the larger figure cited by Prime Minister Dominique de Villepin during his announcement of a nationwide smoke-free law: "That makes more than 13 deaths a day. It is an unacceptable reality in our country in terms of public health."

There is good observational evidence that smoke-free legislation reduces the number of hospital admissions for heart disease.

=== Exposure and risk levels ===
The International Agency for Research on Cancer of the World Health Organization concluded in 2004 that there was sufficient evidence that passive smoke caused cancer in humans. Those who work in environments where smoke is not regulated are at higher risk. Workers particularly at risk of exposure include those in installation repair and maintenance, construction and extraction, and transportation.

Much research has come from studies of nonsmokers who are married to a smoker. The US Surgeon General, in his 2006 report, estimated that living or working in a place where smoking is permitted increases the non-smokers' risk of developing heart disease by 25–30% and lung cancer by 20–30%.

Similarly, children who are exposed to environmental tobacco smoke are shown to experience a range of adverse effects and a higher risk of becoming smokers later in life. The WHO has identified reduction of exposure to environmental tobacco smoke as key element for actions to encourage healthy child development.

The US Centers for Disease Control and Prevention monitors the extent of and trends in exposure to environmental tobacco smoke by measuring serum cotinine in national health surveys. The prevalence of passive smoke exposure among U.S. nonsmokers declined from 87.5% in 1988 to 25.2% in 2014. However, nearly half of black people and poor people were exposed in 2014.

=== Interventions to reduce environmental tobacco smoke ===
A systematic review compared smoking control programmes and their effects on smoke exposure in children. The review distinguishes between community-based, ill-child and healthy-child settings and the most common types of interventions were counselling or brief advice during clinical visits. The review did not find superior outcomes for any intervention, and the authors caution that evidence from adult settings may not generalise well to children.

=== Biomarkers ===
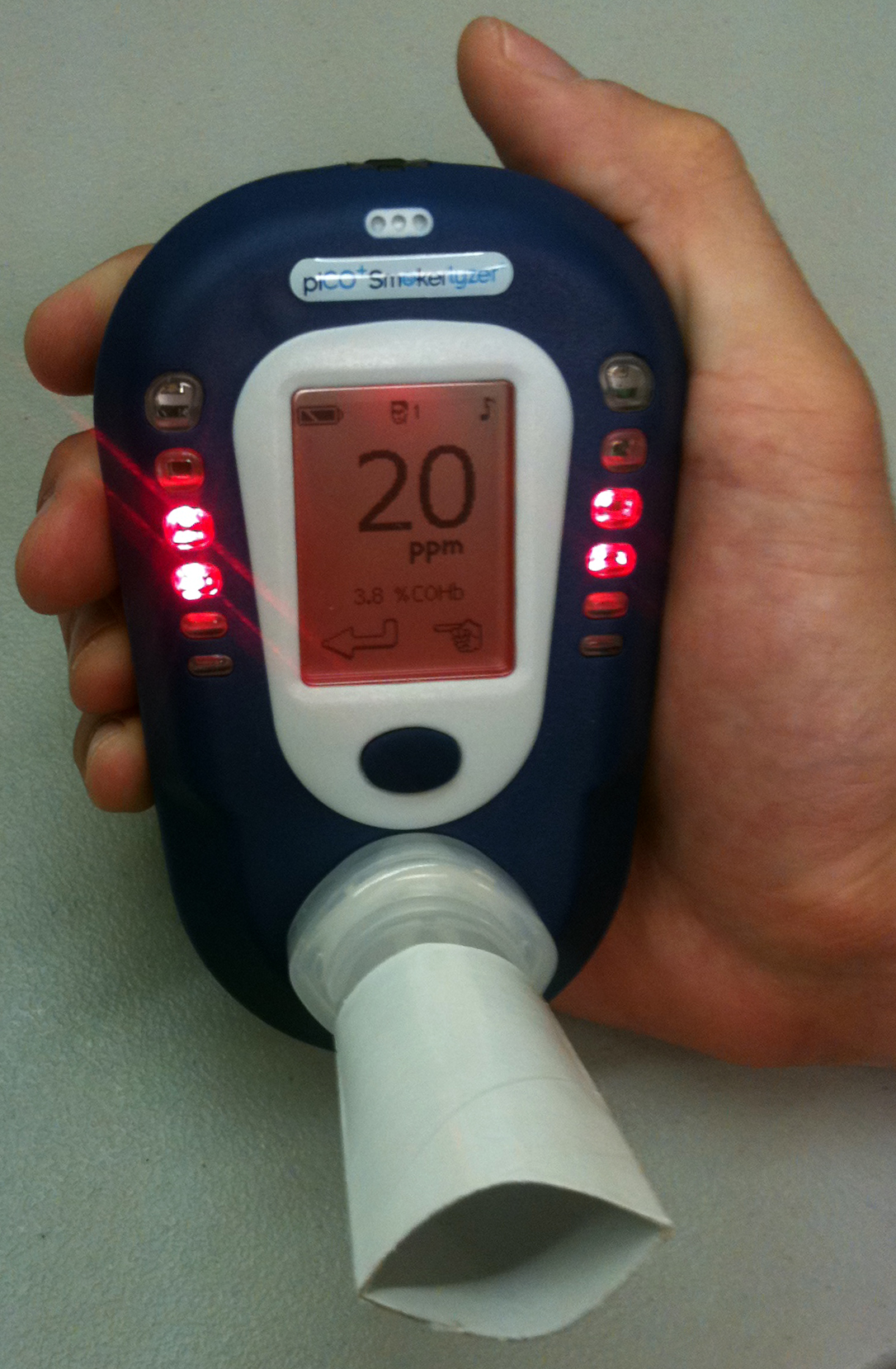
Breath CO monitor displaying carbon monoxide concentration of an exhaled breath sample (in ppm) with corresponding percent concentration of carboxyhemoglobin displayed below

Environmental tobacco smoke can be evaluated either by directly measuring tobacco smoke pollutants found in the air or by using biomarkers, an indirect measure of exposure. Carbon monoxide monitored through breath, nicotine, cotinine, thiocyanates, and proteins are the most specific biological markers of tobacco smoke exposure. Biochemical tests are a much more reliable biomarker of passive smoke exposure than surveys. Certain groups of people are reluctant to disclose their smoking status and exposure to tobacco smoke, especially pregnant women and parents of young children. This is due to their smoking being socially unacceptable. Also, it may be difficult for individuals to recall their exposure to tobacco smoke.

A 2007 study in the Addictive Behaviors journal found a positive correlation between passive tobacco smoke exposure and concentrations of nicotine and/or biomarkers of nicotine in the body. Significant biological levels of nicotine from passive smoke exposure were equivalent to nicotine levels from active smoking and levels that are associated with behaviour changes due to nicotine consumption.

==== Cotinine ====
Cotinine, the metabolite of nicotine, is a biomarker of passive smoke exposure. Typically, cotinine is measured in the blood, saliva, and urine. Hair analysis has recently become a new, noninvasive measurement technique. Cotinine accumulates in hair during hair growth, which results in a measure of long-term, cumulative exposure to tobacco smoke. Urinary cotinine levels have been a reliable biomarker of tobacco exposure and have been used as a reference in many epidemiological studies. However, cotinine levels found in the urine reflect exposure only over the preceding 48 hours. Cotinine levels of the skin, such as the hair and nails, reflect tobacco exposure over the previous three months and are a more reliable biomarker.

==== Carbon monoxide (CO) ====
Carbon monoxide monitored via breath is also a reliable biomarker of passive smoke exposure as well as tobacco use. With high sensitivity and specificity, it not only provides an accurate measure, but the test is also non-invasive, highly reproducible, and low in cost. Breath CO monitoring measures the concentration of CO in an exhalation in parts per million, and this can be directly correlated to the blood CO concentration (carboxyhemoglobin). Breath CO monitors can also be used by emergency services to identify patients who are suspected of having CO poisoning.

== Pathophysiology ==
A 2004 study by the International Agency for Research on Cancer of the World Health Organization concluded that non-smokers are exposed to the same carcinogens as active smokers. Sidestream smoke contains more than 4,000 chemicals, including 69 known carcinogens. Of special concern are polynuclear aromatic hydrocarbons, tobacco-specific N-nitrosamines, and aromatic amines, such as 4-aminobiphenyl, all known to be highly carcinogenic. Mainstream smoke, sidestream smoke, and passive smoke contain largely the same components, however the concentration varies depending on type of smoke. Several well-established carcinogens have been shown by the tobacco companies' own research to be present at higher concentrations in sidestream smoke than in mainstream smoke.

Passive smoke has been shown to produce more particulate-matter (PM) pollution than an idling low-emission diesel engine. In an experiment conducted by the Italian National Cancer Institute, three cigarettes were left smoldering, one after the other, in a 60 m^{3} garage with a limited air exchange. The cigarettes produced PM pollution exceeding outdoor limits, as well as PM concentrations up to 10-fold that of the idling engine.

Passive tobacco smoke exposure has immediate and substantial effects on blood and blood vessels in a way that increases the risk of a heart attack, particularly in people already at risk. Exposure to tobacco smoke for 30 minutes significantly reduces coronary flow velocity reserve in healthy nonsmokers. Passive smoke is also associated with impaired vasodilation among adult nonsmokers. Passive smoke exposure also affects platelet function, vascular endothelium, and myocardial exercise tolerance at levels commonly found in the workplace.

Pulmonary emphysema can be induced in rats through acute exposure to sidestream tobacco smoke (30 cigarettes per day) over a period of 45 days. Degranulation of mast cells contributing to lung damage has also been observed.

The term "third-hand smoke" was recently coined to identify the residual tobacco smoke contamination that remains after the cigarette is extinguished and passive smoke has cleared from the air. Preliminary research suggests that by-products of third-hand smoke may pose a health risk, though the magnitude of risk, if any, remains unknown. In October 2011, it was reported that Christus St. Frances Cabrini Hospital in Alexandria, Louisiana, would seek to eliminate third-hand smoke beginning in July 2012, and that employees whose clothing smelled of smoke would not be allowed to work. This prohibition was enacted because third-hand smoke poses a special danger for the developing brains of infants and small children.

In 2008, there were more than 161,000 deaths attributed to lung cancer in the United States. Of these deaths, an estimated 10% to 15% were caused by factors other than first-hand smoking; equivalent to 16,000 to 24,000 deaths annually. Slightly more than half of the lung cancer deaths caused by factors other than first-hand smoking were found in nonsmokers. Lung cancer in non-smokers may well be considered one of the most common cancer mortalities in the United States. Clinical epidemiology of lung cancer has linked the primary factors closely tied to lung cancer in non-smokers as exposure to second-hand tobacco smoke, carcinogens including radon, and other indoor air pollutants.

== Opinions and studies ==
There is widespread scientific consensus that exposure to passive smoke is harmful. The link between passive smoking and health risks is accepted by every major medical and scientific organisation, including:

- World Health Organization
- U.S. National Institutes of Health
- Centers for Disease Control
- United States Surgeon General
- U.S. National Cancer Institute
- United States Environmental Protection Agency
- California Environmental Protection Agency
- American Heart Association, American Lung Association, and American Cancer Society
- American Medical Association
- American Academy of Pediatrics
- Australian National Health and Medical Research Council
- United Kingdom Scientific Committee on Tobacco and Health

Regarding public opinion, recent major surveys conducted by the U.S. National Cancer Institute and Centers for Disease Control have found widespread public awareness that passive smoke is harmful. In both 1992 and 2000 surveys, more than 80% of respondents agreed with the statement that passive smoke was harmful. A 2001 study found that 95% of adults agreed that passive smoke was harmful to children, and 96% considered tobacco-industry claims that passive smoke was not harmful to be untruthful. A 2007 Gallup poll found that 56% of respondents felt that passive smoke was "very harmful", a number that has held relatively steady since 1997. Another 29% believe that passive smoke is "somewhat harmful"; 10% answered "not too harmful", while 5% said "not at all harmful".

As part of its attempt to prevent or delay tighter regulation of smoking, the tobacco industry funded a number of scientific studies and, where the results cast doubt on the risks associated with passive smoke, sought wide publicity for those results. The industry also funded libertarian and conservative think tanks, such as the Cato Institute in the United States and the Institute of Public Affairs in Australia which criticised both scientific research on passive smoking and policy proposals to restrict smoking. New Scientist and the European Journal of Public Health have identified these industry-wide coordinated activities as one of the earliest expressions of corporate denialism. Further, they state that the disinformation spread by the tobacco industry has created a tobacco denialism movement, sharing many characteristics of other forms of denialism, such as HIV-AIDS denialism.

=== Industry-funded studies and critiques ===
==== Enstrom and Kabat ====
A 2003 study by James Enstrom and Geoffrey Kabat, published in the British Medical Journal, argued that the harms of passive smoking had been overstated. Their analysis reported no statistically significant relationship between passive smoking and lung cancer, coronary heart disease (CHD), or chronic obstructive pulmonary disease, though the accompanying editorial noted that "they may overemphasise the negative nature of their findings." This paper was widely promoted by the tobacco industry as evidence that the harms of passive smoking were unproven. The American Cancer Society (ACS), whose database Enstrom and Kabat used to compile their data, criticized the paper as "neither reliable nor independent", stating that scientists at the ACS had repeatedly pointed out serious flaws in Enstrom and Kabat's methodology prior to publication. Notably, the study had failed to identify a comparison group of "unexposed" persons.

Enstrom's ties to the tobacco industry also drew scrutiny; in a 1997 letter to Philip Morris, Enstrom requested a "substantial research commitment... in order for me to effectively compete against the large mountain of epidemiologic data and opinions that already exist regarding the health effects of ETS and active smoking." In a US racketeering lawsuit against tobacco companies, the Enstrom and Kabat paper was cited by the US District Court as "a prime example of how nine tobacco companies engaged in criminal racketeering and fraud to hide the dangers of tobacco smoke." The Court found that the study had been funded and managed by the Center for Indoor Air Research, a tobacco industry front group tasked with "offsetting" damaging studies on passive smoking, as well as by Philip Morris who stated that Enstrom's work was "clearly litigation-oriented". A 2005 paper in Tobacco Control argued that the disclosure section in the Enstrom and Kabat BMJ paper, although it met the journal's requirements, "does not reveal the full extent of the relationship the authors had with the tobacco industry."

In 2006, Enstrom and Kabat published a meta-analysis of studies regarding passive smoking and coronary heart disease in which they reported a very weak association between passive smoking and heart disease mortality. They concluded that exposure to passive smoke increased the risk of death from CHD by only 5%, although this analysis has been criticized for including two previous industry-funded studies that suffered from widespread exposure misclassification.

==== Gori ====
Gio Batta Gori, a tobacco industry spokesman and consultant and an expert on risk utility and scientific research, wrote in the libertarian Cato Institute's magazine Regulation that "...of the 75 published studies of ETS and lung cancer, some 70% did not report statistically significant differences of risk and are moot. Roughly 17% claim an increased risk and 13% imply a reduction of risk."

==== Milloy ====
Steven Milloy, the "junk science" commentator for Fox News and a former Philip Morris consultant, claimed that "of the 19 studies" on passive smoking "only 8— slightly more than 42%— reported statistically significant increases in heart disease incidence."

Another component of criticism cited by Milloy focused on relative risk and epidemiological practices in studies of passive smoking. Milloy, who has a master's degree from the Johns Hopkins School of Hygiene and Public Health, argued that studies yielding relative risks of less than 2 were meaningless junk science. This approach to epidemiological analysis was criticized in the American Journal of Public Health:

A major component of the industry attack was the mounting of a campaign to establish a "bar" for "sound science" that could not be fully met by most individual investigations, leaving studies that did not meet the criteria to be dismissed as "junk science."

The tobacco industry and affiliated scientists also put forward a set of "Good Epidemiology Practices" which would have the practical effect of obscuring the link between passive smoke and lung cancer; the privately stated goal of these standards was to "impede adverse legislation". However, this effort was largely abandoned when it became clear that no independent epidemiological organization would agree to the standards proposed by Philip Morris et al.

==== Levois and Layard ====
In 1995, Levois and Layard, both tobacco industry consultants, published two analyses in the journal Regulatory Toxicology and Pharmacology regarding the association between spousal exposure to passive smoke and heart disease. Both of these papers reported no association between passive smoke and heart disease. These analyses have been criticized for failing to distinguish between current and former smokers, despite the fact that former smokers, unlike current ones, are not at a significantly increased risk of heart disease.

==== World Health Organization controversy ====
A 1998 study by the International Agency for Research on Cancer (IARC) on environmental tobacco smoke (ETS) found "weak evidence of a dose–response relationship between risk of lung cancer and exposure to spousal and workplace ETS."

In March 1998, before the study was published, reports appeared in the media alleging that the IARC and the World Health Organization (WHO) were suppressing information. The reports, appearing in the British Sunday Telegraph and The Economist, among other sources, alleged that the WHO withheld from publication of its own report that supposedly failed to prove an association between passive smoking and a number of other diseases (lung cancer in particular).

In response, the WHO issued a press release stating that the results of the study had been "completely misrepresented" in the popular press and were in fact very much in line with similar studies demonstrating the harms of passive smoking. The study was published in the Journal of the National Cancer Institute in October of the same year, and concluded the authors found "no association between childhood exposure to ETS and lung cancer risk" but "did find weak evidence of a dose–response relationship between risk of lung cancer and exposure to spousal and workplace ETS." An accompanying editorial summarized:

When all the evidence, including the important new data reported in this issue of the Journal, is assessed, the inescapable scientific conclusion is that ETS is a low-level lung carcinogen.

With the release of formerly classified tobacco industry documents through the Tobacco Master Settlement Agreement, it was found (by Elisa Ong and Stanton Glantz) that the controversy over the WHO's alleged suppression of data had been engineered by Philip Morris, British American Tobacco, and other tobacco companies in an effort to discredit scientific findings which would harm their business interests. A WHO inquiry, conducted after the release of the tobacco-industry documents, found that this controversy was generated by the tobacco industry as part of its larger campaign to cut the WHO's budget, distort the results of scientific studies on passive smoking, and discredit the WHO as an institution. This campaign was carried out using a network of ostensibly independent front organizations and international and scientific experts with hidden financial ties to the industry.

==== EPA lawsuit ====
In 1993, the United States Environmental Protection Agency (EPA) issued a report estimating that 3,000 lung cancer related deaths in the United States were caused by passive smoking annually. Philip Morris, R.J. Reynolds Tobacco Company, and groups representing growers, distributors and marketers of tobacco took legal action, claiming that the EPA had manipulated this study and ignored accepted scientific and statistical practices.

The United States District Court for the Middle District of North Carolina ruled in favor of the tobacco industry in 1998, finding that the EPA had failed to follow proper scientific and epidemiologic practices and had "cherry picked" evidence to support conclusions which they had committed to in advance. The court stated in part, "EPA publicly committed to a conclusion before research had begun...adjusted established procedure and scientific norms to validate the Agency's public conclusion... In conducting the ETS Risk Assessment, disregarded information and made findings on selective information; did not disseminate significant epidemiologic information; deviated from its Risk Assessment Guidelines; failed to disclose important findings and reasoning..."

In 2002, the EPA successfully appealed this decision to the United States Court of Appeals for the Fourth Circuit. The EPA's appeal was upheld on the preliminary grounds that their report had no regulatory weight, and the earlier finding was vacated.

In 1998, the U.S. Department of Health and Human Services, through the publication by its National Toxicology Program of the 9th Report on Carcinogens, listed environmental tobacco smoke among the known carcinogens, observing of the EPA assessment that "The individual studies were carefully summarized and evaluated."

==== Tobacco-industry funding of research ====
The tobacco industry's role in funding scientific research on passive smoke has been controversial. A review of published studies found that tobacco-industry affiliation was strongly correlated with findings exonerating passive smoke; researchers affiliated with the tobacco industry were 88 times more likely than independent researchers to conclude that passive smoke was not harmful. In a specific example which came to light with the release of tobacco-industry documents, Philip Morris executives successfully encouraged an author to revise his industry-funded review article to downplay the role of passive smoke in sudden infant death syndrome. The 2006 U.S. Surgeon General's report criticized the tobacco industry's role in the scientific debate:

The industry has funded or carried out research that has been judged to be biased, supported scientists to generate letters to editors that criticized research publications, attempted to undermine the findings of key studies, assisted in establishing a scientific society with a journal, and attempted to sustain controversy even as the scientific community reached consensus.

This strategy was outlined at an international meeting of tobacco companies in 1988, at which Philip Morris proposed to set up a team of scientists, organized by company lawyers, to "carry out work on ETS to keep the controversy alive." All scientific research was subject to oversight and "filtering" by tobacco-industry lawyers:

Philip Morris then expect the group of scientists to operate within the confines of decisions taken by PM scientists to determine the general direction of research, which apparently would then be 'filtered' by lawyers to eliminate areas of sensitivity.

Philip Morris reported that it was putting "...vast amounts of funding into these projects... in attempting to coordinate and pay so many scientists on an international basis to keep the ETS controversy alive."

=== Tobacco industry response ===
Measures to tackle passive smoke pose a serious economic threat to the tobacco industry, having broadened the definition of smoking beyond a personal habit to something with a social impact. In a confidential 1978 report, the tobacco industry described increasing public concerns about passive smoke as "the most dangerous development to the viability of the tobacco industry that has yet occurred." In United States of America v. Philip Morris et al., the District Court for the District of Columbia found that the tobacco industry "... recognized from the mid-1970s forward that the health effects of passive smoking posed a profound threat to industry viability and cigarette profits," and that the industry responded with "efforts to undermine and discredit the scientific consensus that ETS causes disease."

Accordingly, the tobacco industry have developed several strategies to minimise the impact on their business:

- The industry has sought to position the passive smoke debate as essentially concerned with civil liberties and smokers' rights rather than with health, by funding groups such as FOREST.
- Funding bias in research; in all reviews of the effects of passive smoke on health published between 1980 and 1995, the only factor associated with concluding that passive smoke is not harmful was whether an author was affiliated with the tobacco industry. However, not all studies that failed to find evidence of harm were by industry-affiliated authors.
- Delaying and discrediting legitimate research (see for an example of how the industry attempted to discredit Takeshi Hirayama's landmark study, and for an example of how it attempted to delay and discredit a major Australian report on passive smoking)
- Promoting "good epidemiology" and attacking so-called junk science (a term popularised by industry lobbyist Steven Milloy): attacking the methodology behind research showing health risks as flawed and attempting to promote sound science. Ong & Glantz (2001) cite an internal Phillip Morris memo giving evidence of this as company policy.
- Creation of outlets for favourable research. In 1989, the tobacco industry established the International Society of the Built Environment, which published the peer-reviewed journal Indoor and Built Environment. This journal did not require conflict-of-interest disclosures from its authors. With documents made available through the Master Settlement, it was found that the executive board of the society and the editorial board of the journal were dominated by paid tobacco-industry consultants. The journal published a large amount of material on passive smoking, much of which was "industry-positive".

Citing the tobacco industry's production of biased research and efforts to undermine scientific findings, the 2006 U.S. Surgeon General's report concluded that the industry had "attempted to sustain controversy even as the scientific community reached consensus... industry documents indicate that the tobacco industry has engaged in widespread activities... that have gone beyond the bounds of accepted scientific practice." The U.S. District Court, in U.S.A. v. Philip Morris et al., found that "...despite their internal acknowledgment of the hazards of passive smoke, Defendants have fraudulently denied that ETS causes disease."

==== Position of major tobacco companies ====
The positions of major tobacco companies on the issue of passive smoke is somewhat varied. In general, tobacco companies have continued to focus on questioning the methodology of studies showing that passive smoke is harmful. Some (such as British American Tobacco and Philip Morris) acknowledge the medical consensus that passive smoke carries health risks, while others continue to assert that the evidence is inconclusive. Several tobacco companies advocate the creation of smoke-free areas within public buildings as an alternative to comprehensive smoke-free laws.

=== US racketeering lawsuit against tobacco companies ===
On September 22, 1999, the U.S. Department of Justice filed a racketeering lawsuit against Philip Morris and other major cigarette manufacturers. Almost 7 years later, on August 17, 2006, U.S. District Court Judge Gladys Kessler found that the Government had proven its case and that the tobacco company defendants had violated the Racketeer Influenced Corrupt Organizations Act (RICO). In particular, Judge Kessler found that PM and other tobacco companies had:

- conspired to minimize, distort and confuse the public about the health hazards of smoking;
- publicly denied, while internally acknowledging, that passive tobacco smoke is harmful to nonsmokers, and
- destroyed documents relevant to litigation.

The ruling found that tobacco companies undertook joint efforts to undermine and discredit the scientific consensus that passive smoke causes disease, notably by controlling research findings via paid consultants. The ruling also concluded that tobacco companies were fraudulently continuing to deny the health effects of ETS exposure.

On May 22, 2009, a three-judge panel of the U.S. Court of Appeals for the District of Columbia Circuit unanimously upheld the lower court's 2006 ruling.

== Smoke-free laws ==
As a consequence of the health risks associated with passive smoke, many national and local governments have outlawed smoking in indoor public places, including restaurants, cafés, and nightclubs, as well as some outdoor open areas. Ireland was the first country in the world to institute a comprehensive national ban on smoking in all indoor workplaces on 29 March 2004. Since then, many others have followed suit. The countries which have ratified the WHO Framework Convention on Tobacco Control (FCTC) have a legal obligation to implement effective legislation "for protection from exposure to tobacco smoke in indoor workplaces, public transport, indoor public places and, as appropriate, other public places." (Article 8 of the FCTC) The parties to the FCTC have further adopted Guidelines on the Protection from Exposure to second-hand Smoke which state that "effective measures to provide protection from exposure to tobacco smoke ... require the total elimination of smoking and tobacco smoke in a particular space or environment in order to create a 100% smoke-free environment."

Opinion polls have shown considerable support for smoke-free laws. In June 2007, a survey of 15 countries found 80% approval for such laws. A survey in France, reputedly a nation of smokers, showed 70% support.

=== Effects ===
Smoking bans by governments result in decreased harm from passive smoke, including less admissions for acute coronary syndrome. In the first 18 months after the town of Pueblo, Colorado, enacted a smoke-free law in 2003, hospital admissions for heart attacks dropped 27%. Admissions in neighbouring towns without smoke-free laws showed no change, and the decline in heart attacks in Pueblo was attributed to the resulting reduction in passive smoke exposure. A 2004 smoking ban instituted in Massachusetts workplaces decreased workers' passive smoke exposure from 8% of workers in 2003 to 5.4% of workers in 2010. A 2016 review also found that bans and policy changes in specific locations such as hospitals or universities can lead to reduced smoking rates. In prison settings bans might lead to reduced mortality and to lower exposure to passive smoke.

In 2001, a systematic review for the Guide to Community Preventive Services acknowledged strong evidence of the effectiveness of smoke-free policies and restrictions in reducing expose to passive smoke. A follow-up to this review, identified the evidence on which the effectiveness of smoking bans reduced the prevalence of tobacco use. Articles published until 2005, were examined to further support this evidence. The examined studies provided sufficient evidence that smoke-free policies reduce tobacco use among workers when implemented in worksites or by communities.

While a number of studies funded by the tobacco industry have claimed a negative economic impact from smoke-free laws, no independently funded research has shown any such impact. A 2003 review reported that independently funded, methodologically sound research consistently found either no economic impact or a positive impact from smoke-free laws.

Air nicotine levels were measured in Guatemalan bars and restaurants before and after an implemented smoke-free law in 2009. Nicotine concentrations significantly decreased in both the bars and restaurants measured. Also, the employees' support for a smoke-free workplace substantially increased in the post-implementation survey compared to pre-implementation survey.

=== Public opinion ===
Recent surveys taken by the Society for Research on Nicotine and Tobacco demonstrate supportive attitudes of the public towards smoke-free policies in outdoor areas. A vast majority of the public supports restricting smoking in various outdoor settings. The respondents' support for the policies were for varying reasons such as litter control, establishing positive smoke-free role models for youth, reducing youth opportunities to smoke, and avoiding exposure to passive smoke.

=== Alternative forms ===
Alternatives to smoke-free laws have also been proposed as a means of harm reduction, particularly in bars and restaurants. For example, critics of smoke-free laws cite studies suggesting ventilation as a means of reducing tobacco smoke pollutants and improving air quality. Ventilation has also been heavily promoted by the tobacco industry as an alternative to outright bans, via a network of ostensibly independent experts with often undisclosed ties to the industry. However, not all critics have connections to the industry.

The American Society of Heating, Refrigerating and Air-Conditioning Engineers (ASHRAE) officially concluded in 2005 that while completely isolated smoking rooms do eliminate the risk to nearby non-smoking areas, smoking bans are the only means of eliminating health risks associated with indoor exposure. They further concluded that no system of dilution or cleaning was effective at eliminating risk. The U.S. Surgeon General and the European Commission Joint Research Centre have reached similar conclusions. The implementation guidelines for the WHO Framework Convention on Tobacco Control states that engineering approaches, such as ventilation, are ineffective and do not protect against passive smoke exposure. However, this does not necessarily mean that such measures are useless in reducing harm, only that they fall short of the goal of reducing exposure completely to zero.

Others have suggested a system of tradable smoking pollution permits, similar to the cap-and-trade pollution permits systems used by the United States Environmental Protection Agency in recent decades to curb other types of pollution. This would guarantee that a portion of bars/restaurants in a jurisdiction will be smoke-free, while leaving the decision to the market.

== In animals ==
Multiple studies have been conducted to determine the carcinogenicity of environmental tobacco smoke to animals. These studies typically fall under the categories of simulated environmental tobacco smoke, administering condensates of sidestream smoke, or observational studies of cancer among pets.

To simulate environmental tobacco smoke, scientists expose animals to sidestream smoke, that which emanates from the cigarette's burning cone and through its paper, or a combination of mainstream and sidestream smoke. The IARC monographs conclude that mice with prolonged exposure to simulated environmental tobacco smoke, that is six hours a day, five days a week, for five months with a subsequent four-month interval before dissection, will have significantly higher incidence and multiplicity of lung tumors than with control groups.

The IARC monographs concluded that sidestream smoke condensates had a significantly higher carcinogenic effect on mice than did mainstream smoke condensates.

=== Observational studies ===
Passive smoke is popularly recognised as a risk factor for cancer in pets. A study conducted by the Tufts University School of Veterinary Medicine and the University of Massachusetts Amherst linked the occurrence of feline oral cancer to exposure to environmental tobacco smoke through an overexpression of the p53 gene. Another study conducted at the same universities concluded that cats living with a smoker were more likely to get feline lymphoma; the risk increased with the duration of exposure to passive smoke and the number of smokers in the household. A study by Colorado State University researchers, looking at cases of canine lung cancer, was generally inconclusive, though the authors reported a weak relation for lung cancer in dogs exposed to environmental tobacco smoke. The number of smokers within the home, the number of packs smoked in the home per day, and the amount of time that the dog spent within the home had no effect on the dog's risk for lung cancer.

== See also ==
- Health effects of tobacco
- Third-hand smoke
- Tobacco control
- Philip Morris v. Uruguay
