= Electronic cigarette =

Device that vaporizes a liquid nicotine solution for inhalation

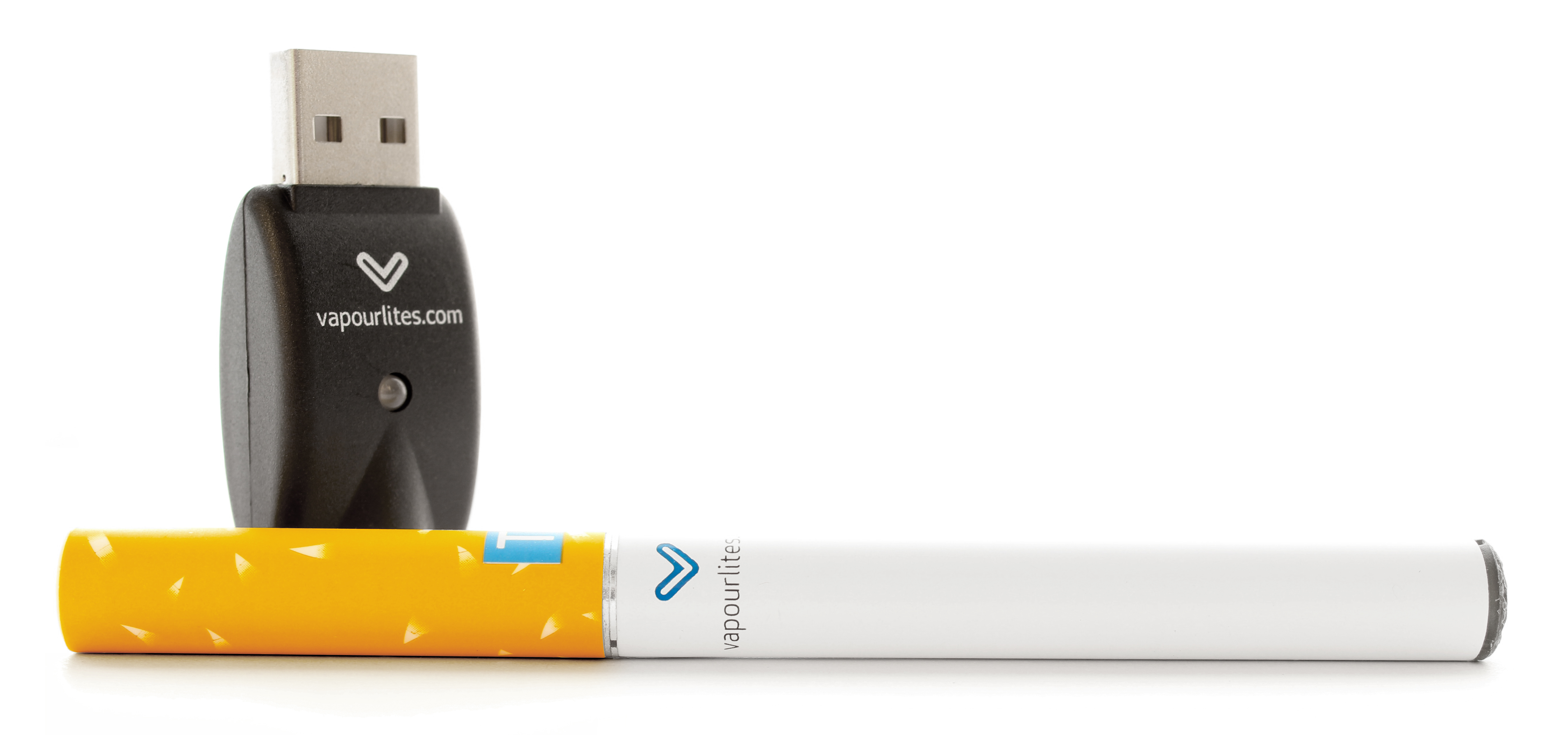
A first-generation e-cigarette that resembles a tobacco cigarette, with a battery portion that can be disconnected and recharged using the USB power charger

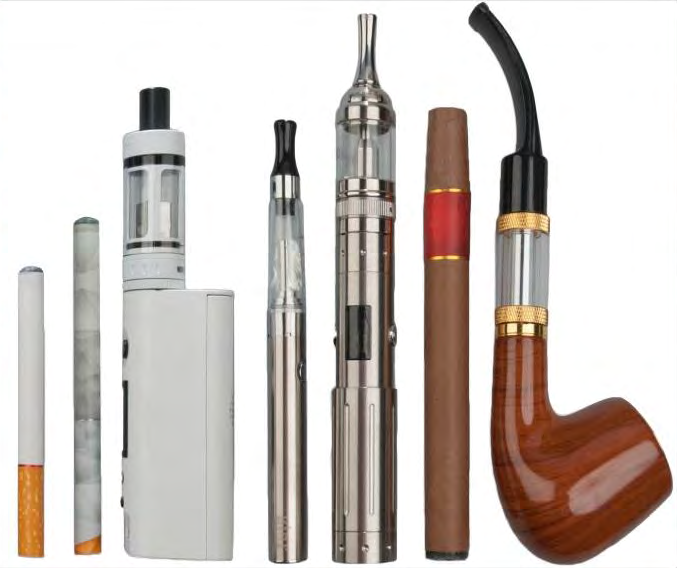
Various types of e-cigarettes from 2015, including a disposable e-cigarette, a rechargeable e-cigarette, a medium-size tank device, large-size tank devices, an e-cigar, and an e-pipe

An electronic cigarette (e-cigarette) or vape (Note: Also known as an e-cig, vaporizer, vape pen, hookah pen, e-pipe, nic stick, razz or, formally, electronic nicotine delivery system (ENDS).) is a device that simulates tobacco smoking. It consists of an atomizer, a power source such as a battery, and a container such as a cartridge or tank. Instead of smoke, the user inhales vapor, often called "vaping".

The atomizer is a heating element that vaporizes a liquid solution called e-liquid that cools into an aerosol of tiny droplets, vapor and air. The vapor mainly comprises propylene glycol or glycerin, usually with nicotine and flavoring. Its exact composition varies, and depends on matters such as user behavior. (Note: A 2014 review found "In addition to the uniqueness of the liquid compositions in each brand, inconsistency of both the device performance properties and the data collection methodologies used by researchers contribute to the observed variation in constituent levels and to the range of particle size distributions among products.") E-cigarettes are activated by taking a puff or pressing a button. Some look like traditional cigarettes, and most kinds are reusable. (Note: "Most ENDS consist of a rechargeable, battery-operated heating element and a replaceable or refillable cartridge for the e-liquid. An atomizer heats the liquid in the cartridge to convert it into an aerosol, which is then inhaled by the user. Most of these products are rechargeable, but some are disposable.")

Vaping is less harmful than smoking, but still has health risks, particularly for those with asthma. Limited evidence indicates that e-cigarettes are less addictive than smoking, with slower nicotine absorption rates.

E-cigarettes containing nicotine are more effective than nicotine replacement therapy (NRT) for smoking cessation, but have not been tested as rigorously as nicotine replacement therapy products.

== Description ==
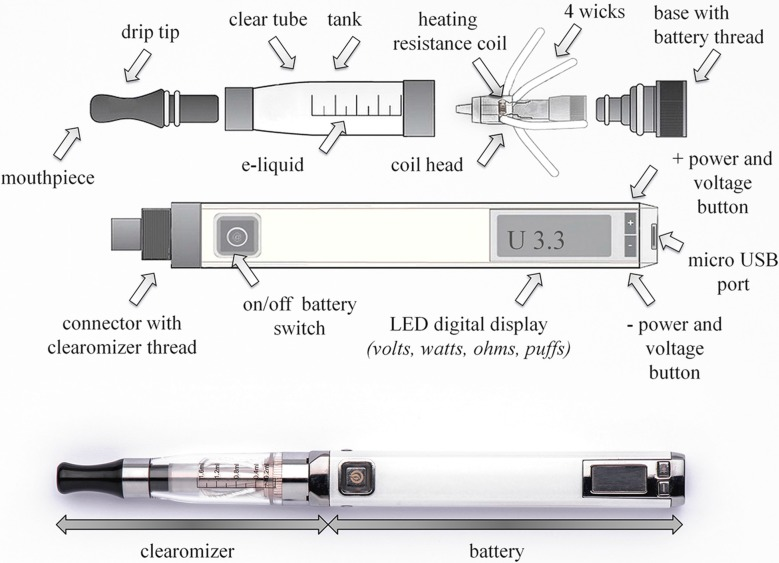
An exploded view of a typical e-cigarette design, with transparent atomizer (labeled clearomizer in diagram) and changeable dual-coil head

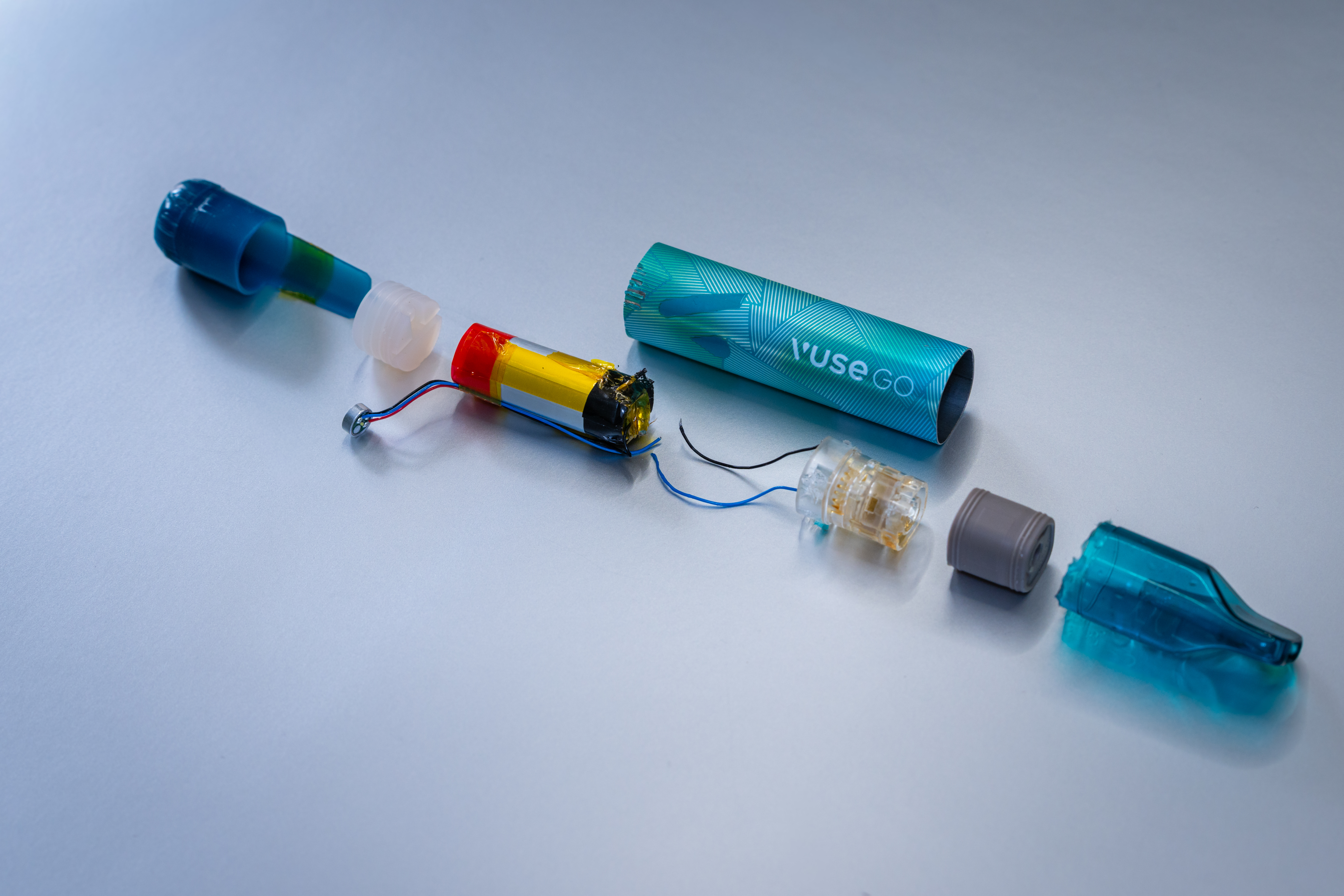
Components of a disposable e-cigarette

An electronic cigarette consists of an atomizer, a power source such as a battery, and a container for e-liquid such as a cartridge or tank. E-cigarettes come in many shapes and sizes, including disposable devices, refillable devices, and devices with pre-filled cartridges or pods.

E-cigarettes have evolved over time, and the different designs are classified in generations. First-generation e-cigarettes tend to look like traditional cigarettes and are called "cigalikes". Second-generation devices are larger and look less like traditional cigarettes. Third-generation devices include mechanical mods and variable voltage devices. The fourth-generation includes sub-ohm tanks (meaning they have electrical resistance of less than 1 ohm) and temperature control. There are also pod mod devices that use protonated nicotine, rather than free-base nicotine found in earlier generations, providing higher nicotine yields.

Some electronic cigarettes contain synthetic nicotine analogues (for example, 6-methyl nicotine, sometimes marketed under the trade name "Metatine") and makers are trying develop nicotine substitutes.

=== E-liquid ===
The mixture used in vapor products such as e-cigarettes is called e-liquid. E-liquid formulations vary widely. A typical e-liquid contains propylene glycol and glycerin (95%) with a combination of flavorings, nicotine, and other additives (5%). The flavorings may be natural, artificial, or organic. When e-liquids are heated, by-products such as formaldehyde, acetaldehyde, and acrolein can form, at levels that depend on operating conditions and liquid composition. There are many e-liquid makers and more than 15,000 flavors.

The e-liquid usually contains nicotine from tobacco, but some products use non-tobacco nicotine, including synthetic lab-made nicotine. Many e-liquids use nicotine salts made by adding organic acids such as benzoic acid to nicotine, so as to reduce throat irritation. Some e-liquids also contain synthetic cooling agents.

Many countries regulate what e-liquids can contain. In the US, there are Food and Drug Administration (FDA) compulsory manufacturing standards and American E-liquid Manufacturing Standards Association (AEMSA) recommended manufacturing standards. European Union standards are published in the EU Tobacco Products Directive.

=== Coils ===
Vaping cannabis usually involves higher temperatures than nicotine. Internal components of e-cigarettes can add metals and metalloids to the aerosol, including lead, nickel, and antimony.

== Use ==
=== Popularity ===
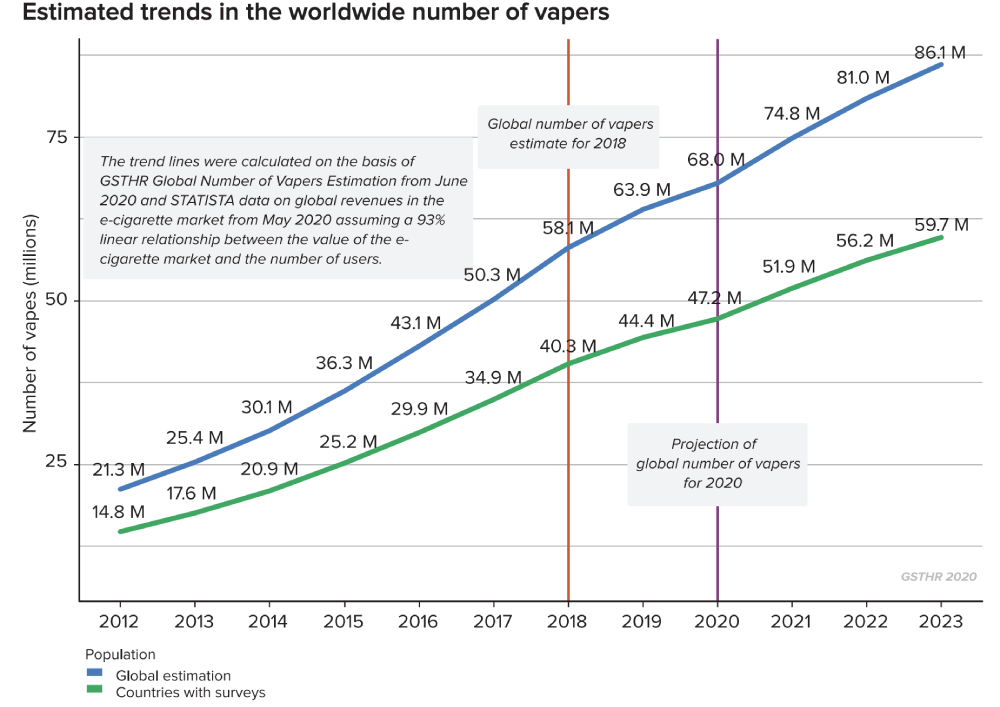
Estimated trends in the global number of vapers

Since entering the market around 2003, e-cigarette use has risen rapidly. In 2011 there were about 7 million adult e-cigarette users globally, increasing to 68 million in 2020 compared with 1.1 billion cigarette smokers. There was a further rise to 82 million e-cigarette users in 2021. This increase has been attributed to targeted marketing and to electronic cigarettes being cheaper and safer than the traditional combustible type. E-cigarette use is highest in China, the US, and Europe, with China having the most users.

=== Motivation ===
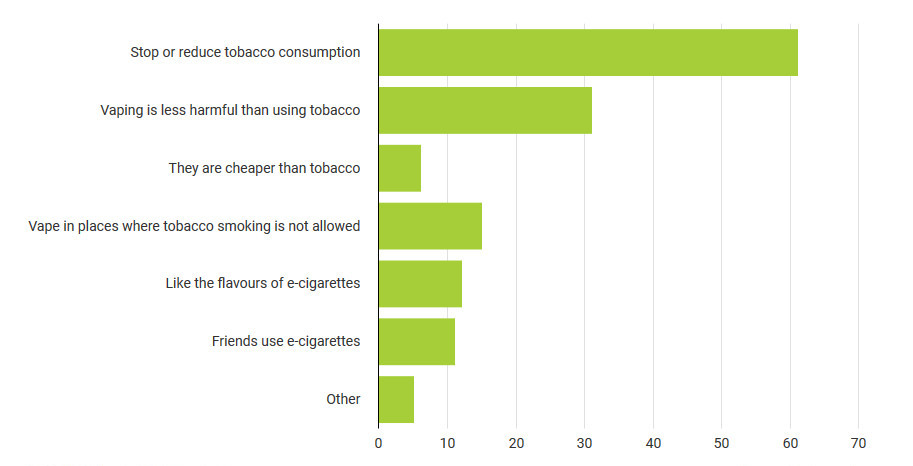
Reasons for initiating e-cigarette use in the European Union, in a 2018 Eurobarometer poll

There are varied reasons for e-cigarette use. Most users are trying to quit smoking, but some use is recreational or as an attempt to get around smoke-free laws. Many people vape to relax, and some because vaping is safer than smoking. The wide choice of flavors and lower price compared to cigarettes are also important factors.

Other motivations include reduced odor and fewer stains. E-cigarettes also appeal to technophiles who enjoy customizing their devices.

=== Gateway hypothesis ===
The gateway hypothesis is the idea that using less harmful drugs can lead to more harmful ones. Some users who begin by vaping will go on to also smoke traditional cigarettes. People with mental illnesses, who as a group are more susceptible to nicotine addiction, are at particularly high risk of dual use.

The correlation between vaping and subsequent smoking does not necessarily imply a causal effect. Users may have underlying characteristics that predispose them to nicotine use. There is a genetic association between smoking, vaping, gambling, promiscuity, and risk-taking behaviors. Young people with poor executive function vape, smoke, and drink alcohol more than their peers. E-cigarette users are also more likely to use both cannabis and unprescribed Adderall or Ritalin. Longitudinal studies of e-cigarettes and smoking have been criticized for failing to adequately control for these and other confounding factors.

Smoking rates have declined as e-cigarette usage has grown, especially among young people. This may be because there is little gateway effect at the population level, or because of anti-smoking interventions.

=== Young adult and teenage users ===
Worldwide, increasing numbers of young people are vaping. With access to e-cigarettes, young people's tobacco use has dropped by about 75%. Most young e-cigarette users have never smoked, but there is a substantial minority who both vape and smoke. Many young people who would not smoke are vaping. Young people who smoke tobacco or marijuana, or who drink alcohol, are much more likely to vape. Among young people who have tried vaping, most used a flavored product the first time.

Vaping correlates with smoking among young people, even in those who would otherwise be unlikely to smoke.

In the U.S., among young people, e-cigarette use increased rapidly in the late 2010s, peaked in 2019, and had fallen substantially by 2024 (7.8% in high school students and 3.5% in middle school students). During that period, the FDA also expanded enforcement activity against unauthorized e-cigarette products. Despite these declines, e-cigarettes remained the most commonly used tobacco product among US youth for the 11th consecutive year in 2024, while cigarette smoking reached historically low levels (1.4% current use). Compared to e-cigarettes, conventional cigarette use had fallen to 1.7% among high school students and 1.1% among middle school students, the lowest prevalence recorded by the survey, according to the 2024 NYTS. Among young people who used e-cigarettes in 2024, 26.3% reported daily use and 87.6% used flavored products, with fruit flavors being the most common. Analyses of NYTS data indicate that the decline observed between 2023 and 2024 was primarily driven by reductions among high school students. The same report noted that disparities persist, with increased in tobacco product use observed in some groups. US federal reporting has also described a longer-term pattern in which e-cigarette use among young people peaked in 2019 and declined substantially by 2024; during this period, regulatory and enforcement actions against unauthorized e-cigarette products were expanded.

Data from other countries provide additional comparisons. In Great Britain, a 2024 ASH/YouGov youth survey reported that vaping among 11-17 year olds appears to have stabilized after earlier increases (ever-use 18% in 2024 compared with 20% in 2023). The same survey reported current vaping at 7.2% among 11-17 year olds (including less-than-monthly use). Additionally, UK reporting has described proposals in the Tobacco and Vapes Bill, including restrictions aimed at reducing youth uptake. Following 2024 UK survey results, the Royal College of Pediatrics and Child Health called for measures including restrictions on disposable e-cigarettes, flavors, and advertising to reduce youth uptake. In Canada, there was a trend showing 29% of young people reporting to have used e-cigarettes in 2017, increasing to 37% in 2018. In New Zealand, school survey data indicated that regular and daily vaping had declined by 2024 after peaking in 2021 and the 2024/25 the New Zealand Health Survey reported that daily smoking had reduced to below 5.0% among people aged 15–24. ASH New Zealand stated that earlier increases in youth vaping occurred during a period before vaping products were comprehensively regulated in late 2020. In Canada reported that past-30-day vaping among youth aged 12–17 declined from 13.2% in 2019 to 7.2% in 2023. Health Canada also set a target of reducing vaping prevalence among those aged 12 to 17 to below 10% by 2025.

== History ==
It is commonly stated that the modern e-cigarette was patented in 2003 by Chinese pharmacist Hon Lik, but tobacco companies had been developing nicotine aerosol generation devices since as early as 1963.

=== Early prototypes and barriers to entry: 1920s–1990s ===
In 1927, Joseph Robinson applied for a patent for an electronic vaporizer to be used with medicinal compounds. The patent was approved in 1930 but the device was never marketed. In 1930, the United States Patent and Trademark Office reported a patent stating, "for holding medicinal compounds which are electrically or otherwise heated to produce vapors for inhalation." In 1934 and 1936, further similar patents were applied for.

The earliest e-cigarette can be traced to American Herbert A. Gilbert. In 1963, Gilbert applied for a patent for "a smokeless non-tobacco cigarette" that involved "replacing burning tobacco and paper with heated, moist, flavored air". This device produced flavored steam without nicotine. The patent was granted in 1965. Gilbert's invention was ahead of its time. However, it received little attention and was never commercialized because smoking was still fashionable at that time. Gilbert said in 2013 that today's electric cigarettes follow the basic design set forth in his original patent.

The Favor cigarette, introduced in 1986 by public company Advanced Tobacco Products, was another early noncombustible product promoted as an alternative nicotine-based tobacco product. Favor was conceptualized by Phil Ray, one of the founders of Datapoint Corporation and inventors of the microprocessor. Development started in 1979 by Phil Ray and Norman Jacobson. Favor was a "plastic, smoke-free product shaped and colored like a conventional cigarette that contained a filter paper soaked with liquid nicotine so users could draw a small dose by inhaling. There was no electricity, combustion, or smoke; it delivered only nicotine."

Favor cigarettes were sold in California and several Southwestern states, marketed as "an alternative to smokers, and only to smokers, to use where smoking is unacceptable or prohibited." In 1987, the FDA exercised jurisdiction over products analogous to E-Cigarettes. Advanced Tobacco Products never challenged the Warning Letter and ceased all distribution of Favor. Ray's wife Brenda Coffee coined the term vaping. Philip Morris' division NuMark, launched in 2013 the MarkTen e-cigarette that Philip Morris had been working on since 1990.

=== Modern electronic cigarette: 2000s ===
Despite these earlier efforts, Hon Lik, a Chinese pharmacist and inventor, who worked as a research pharmacist for a company producing ginseng products, is frequently credited with the invention of the modern e-cigarette. Hon quit smoking after his father, also a heavy smoker, died of lung cancer. In 2001, he thought of using a high frequency, piezoelectric ultrasound-emitting element to vaporize a pressurized jet of liquid containing nicotine. This design creates a smoke-like vapor. Hon said that using resistance heating obtained better results and the difficulty was to scale down the device to a small enough size. Hon's invention was intended to be an alternative to smoking. Hon Lik sees the e-cigarette as comparable to the "digital camera taking over from the analogue camera." Ultimately, Hon Lik did not quit smoking. He is now a dual user, both smoking and vaping.

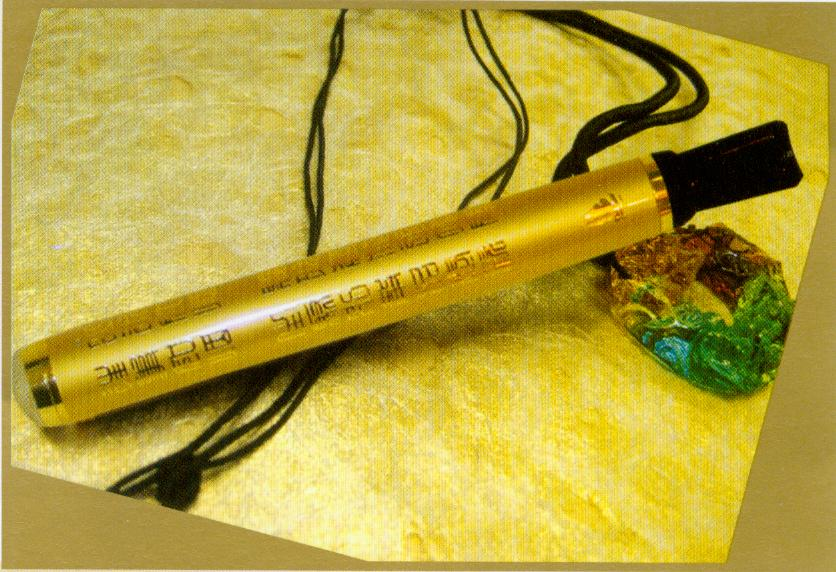
The Ruyan e-cigar was first launched in China in 2004.

Hon Lik registered a patent for the modern e-cigarette design in 2003. Hon is credited with developing the first commercially successful electronic cigarette. The e-cigarette was first introduced to the Chinese domestic market in 2004. Many versions made their way to the US, sold mostly over the Internet by small marketing firms. E-cigarettes entered the European market and the US market in 2006 and 2007. The company that Hon worked for, Golden Dragon Holdings, registered an international patent in November 2007. The company changed its name to Ruyan (如烟, literally "like smoke") later the same month, and started exporting its products. Ruyan later changed its company name to Dragonite International Limited.

Many e-cigarette makers copied his designs illegally, so Hon didn't receive all of the financial reward for his invention. In 2009 his company successfully sued a competitor in China, and after getting a US patent in 2012, they launched patent infringement lawsuits against multiple US companies. In 2013 his company sold its e-vapor business to Imperial Brands for 75 million USD. As of 2014, most e-cigarettes used a battery-powered heating element rather than the earlier ultrasonic technology design.

Initially, their performance did not meet the expectations of users. The e-cigarette continued to evolve from the first-generation three-part device. In 2007, British entrepreneurs Umer and Tariq Sheikh invented the cartomizer. This is a mechanism that integrates the heating coil into the liquid chamber. They launched this new device in the UK in 2008 under their Gamucci brand and the design is now widely adopted by most "cigalike" brands. Other users tinkered with various parts to produce more satisfactory homemade devices, and the hobby of "modding" was born. The first mod to replace the e-cigarette's case to accommodate a longer-lasting battery, dubbed the "screwdriver", was developed by Ted and Matt Rogers in 2008. This device generated a lot of interest, as it let the user to vape for hours at one time. Other enthusiasts built their own mods to improve functionality or aesthetics. When pictures of mods appeared at online vaping forums many people wanted them, so some mod makers produced more for sale.

These mods led to demand for customizable e-cigarettes, prompting manufacturers to produce devices with interchangeable components that could be selected by the user. In 2009, Joyetech developed the eGo series which offered the power of the screwdriver model and a user-activated switch to a wide market. The clearomizer was invented in 2009. Originating from the cartomizer design, it contained the wicking material, an e-liquid chamber, and an atomizer coil within a single clear component. The clearomizer allows the user to monitor the liquid level in the device. Soon after the clearomizer reached the market, replaceable atomizer coils and variable voltage batteries were introduced. Clearomizers and eGo batteries became the best-selling customizable e-cigarette components in early 2012.

=== International growth: 2010s ===
The market for electronic cigarettes rose rapidly during the early 2010s and it started gaining attention in mainstream media. International tobacco companies dismissed e-cigarettes as a fad at first, but, recognizing a potential new market sector that could make smoking obsolete, they began to produce and market their own brands of e-cigarettes and acquire existing e-cigarette companies.

Tobacco companies bought established e-cigarette companies. Blu eCigs, a prominent US e-cigarette manufacturer, was acquired by Lorillard Inc. for $135 million in April 2012. Japan Tobacco invested in Ploom. British American Tobacco was the first tobacco business to sell e-cigarettes in the UK and launched the e-cigarette Vype in July 2013. Imperial Tobacco's Fontem Ventures acquired the intellectual property owned by Hon Lik through Dragonite International Limited for $US 75 million in 2013 and launched Puritane in partnership with Boots UK. On 1 October 2013 Lorillard Inc. acquired another e-cigarette company, this time the UK based company SKYCIG. SKY was rebranded as blu.

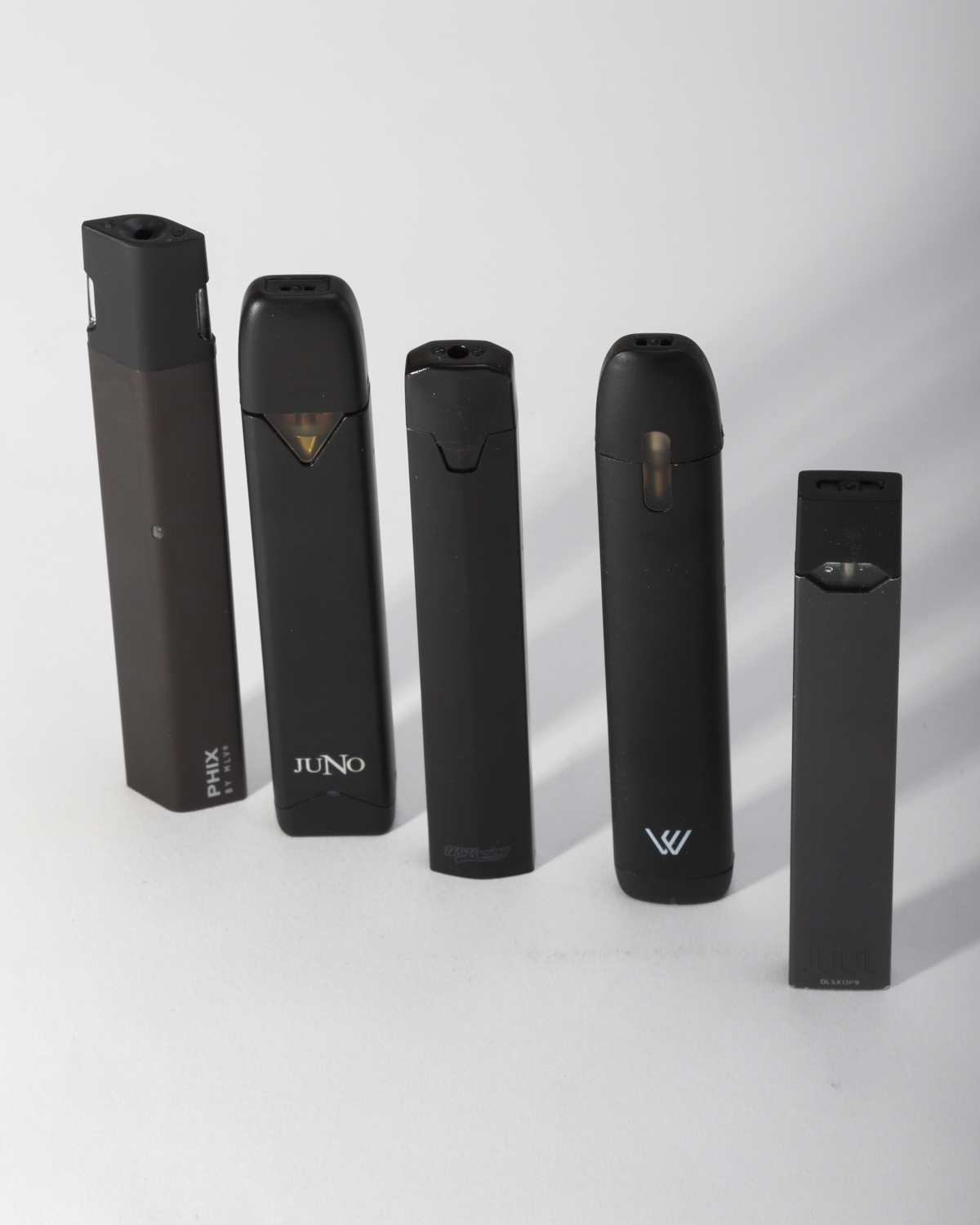
Various e-cigarettes from 2018. From left to right: Phix, Juno, Von Erl, Juul

On 3 February 2014, Altria Group, Inc. acquired popular e-cigarette brand Green Smoke (Note: Altria no longer sells e-cigarettes.) for $110 million. The deal was finalized in April 2014 for $110 million with $20 million in incentive payments. Altria also markets its own e-cigarette, the MarkTen, while Reynolds American has entered the sector with its Vuse product. Philip Morris, the world's largest tobacco company, purchased UK's Nicocigs in June 2014. On 30 April 2015, Japan Tobacco bought the US Logic e-cigarette brand. Japan Tobacco also bought the UK E-Lites brand in June 2014. On 15 July 2014, Lorillard sold blu to Imperial Tobacco as part of a deal for $7.1 billion.

Following these changes, the main players in the e-cigarette market (at least in the US) were as follows (as of end 2015):

Company	Brand(s)
Reynolds American, Inc.	Vuse
Fontem (Imperial Brands)	Blu
Japan Tobacco International	Logic
Altria Group	MarkTen, Green Smoke
CB Distributors	21st Century Smoke
Njoy, Inc.	NJOY
Ballantyne Brands, Inc.	Mistic, NEO
VMR Products	V2, Vapor Couture
Nicotek	Metro
FIN Branding Group	FIN

Despite the acquisitions by big tobacco companies, some independent e-cigarette companies had more success, most notably Juul Labs, as of 2018.

As of 2018, 95% of e-cigarettes were made in China. Despite international growth of e-cigarettes during the 2010s, not all regions around the world have yet embraced it as much. In 2018, Indonesia became only one of the first in Asia or the Global South to recognise e-cigarettes as a genuine alternative to smoking tobacco.

=== Established: 2020s ===
In the United States between 2020 and 2022, the number of e-cigarettes sold had climbed to 22.7 million units. Elf Bar/EBDESIGN, Vuse, JUUL, NJOY and Breeze Smoke were recognized as the five most popular brands as of December 2022. The surge was driven by non-tobacco flavors such as menthol (for prefilled cartridges) and fruit and candy (for disposables), according to the CDC's health economist Fatma Romeh Ali.

In the UK, where most vaping uses refillable sets and e-liquid, there is now support from the National Health Service, and other medical bodies now embrace the use of e-cigarettes as a viable way to quit smoking. This has contributed to record numbers of people vaping, with an estimated 3.6 million in 2021.

Nationally, about 7% of children and teenagers (aged 11–17) currently vape, which equates to roughly 400,000 children in Great Britain. Additionally, around 20% of young people have tried vaping at least once. Many vape brands are popular such as Lost mary Bm600 disposables (one use products) and The R and M Tornado 9000. "In 2025, reports highlighted the rise of illegal 'mega vapes' being sold to minors."

== Society and culture ==
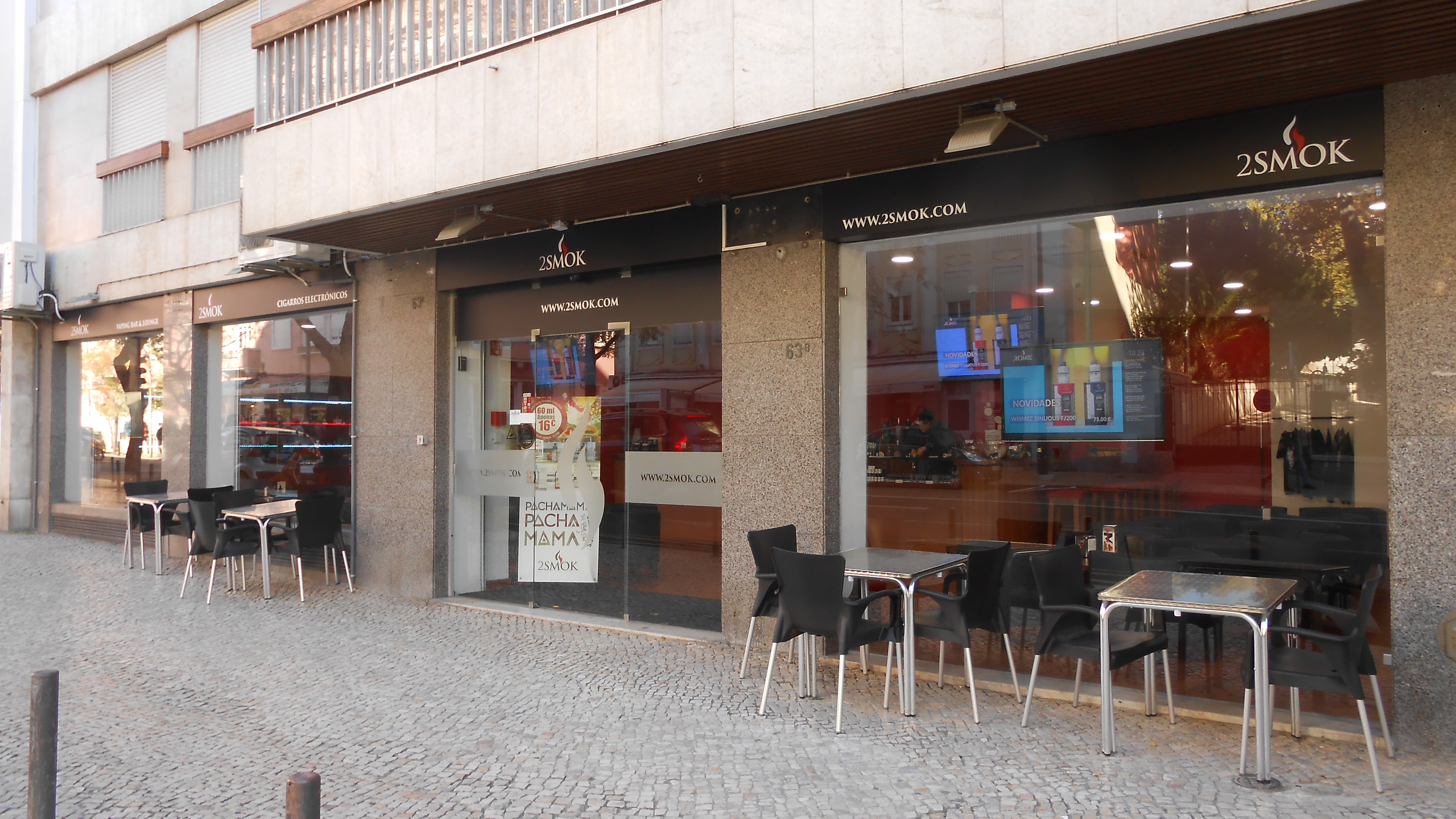
The exterior of a vape shop in Lisbon, Portugal

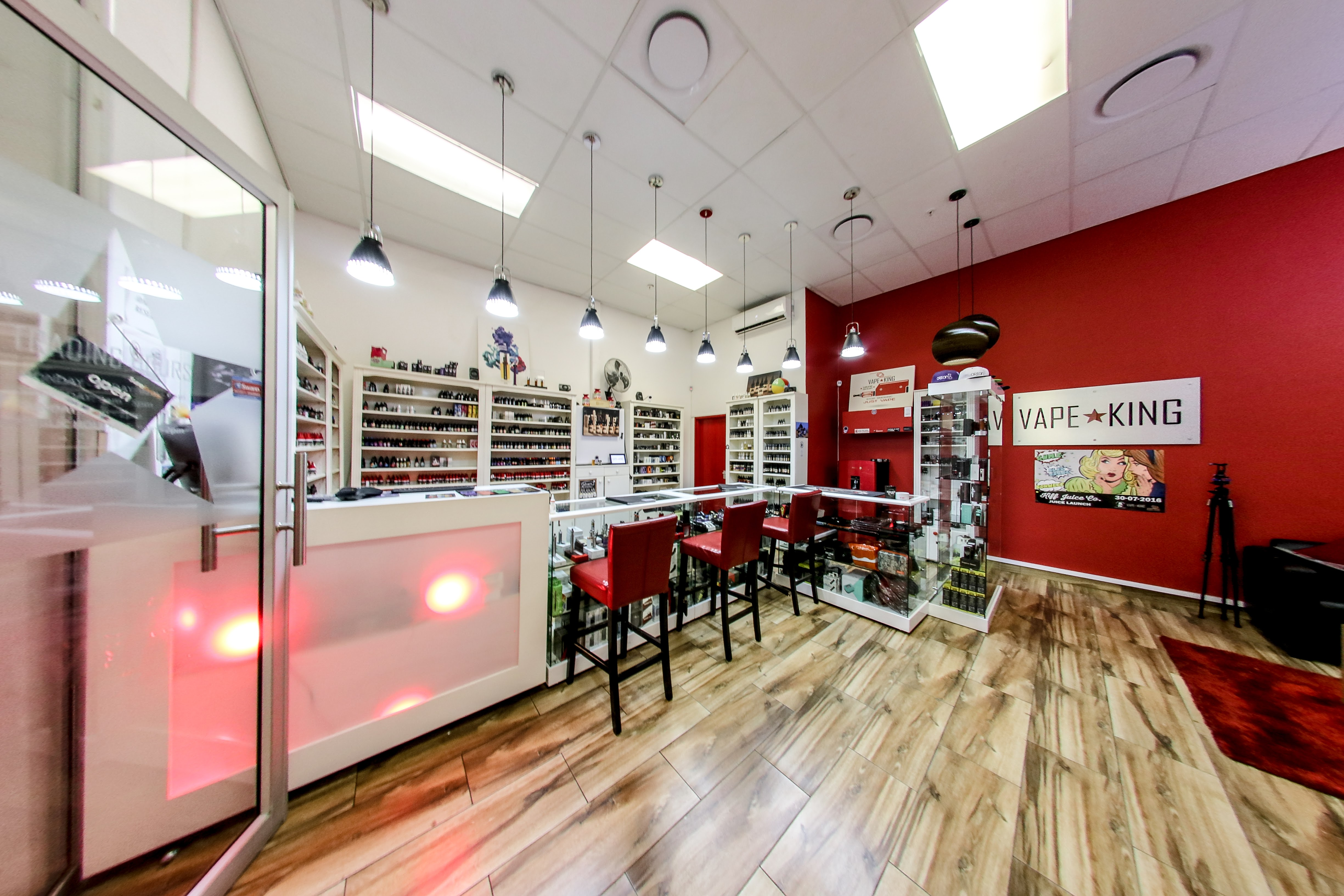
The inside of a vape shop in Johannesburg, South Africa

Consumers have shown passionate support for e-cigarettes that other nicotine replacement products did not receive. They have a mass appeal that could challenge combustible tobacco's market position.

By 2013, a subculture had emerged calling itself "the vaping community". Members often see e-cigarettes as a safer alternative to smoking, and some view it as a hobby. The online forum E-Cig-Reviews.com was one of the first major communities. It and other online forums, such as UKVaper.org, were where the hobby of modding started. There are also groups on Facebook and Reddit. Online forums based around modding have grown in the vaping community.

Vapers embrace activities associated with e-cigarettes and sometimes evangelise for them. E-cigarette companies have a substantial online presence, and there are many individual vapers who blog and tweet about e-cigarette related products. A 2014 Postgraduate Medical Journal editorial said vapers "also engage in grossly offensive online attacks on anyone who has the temerity to suggest that ENDS are anything other than an innovation that can save thousands of lives with no risks".

Contempt for Big Tobacco is part of vaping culture. Tobacco and e-cigarette companies interact with consumers for their policy agenda. The companies use websites, social media, and marketing to get consumers involved in opposing bills that include e-cigarettes in smoke-free laws. This is similar to tobacco industry activity going back to the 1980s. These approaches were used in Europe to minimize the EU Tobacco Products Directive in October 2013. Grassroots lobbying also influenced the Tobacco Products Directive decision. Tobacco companies have worked with organizations conceived to promote e-cigarette use, and these organizations have worked to hamper legislation intended at restricting e-cigarette use.

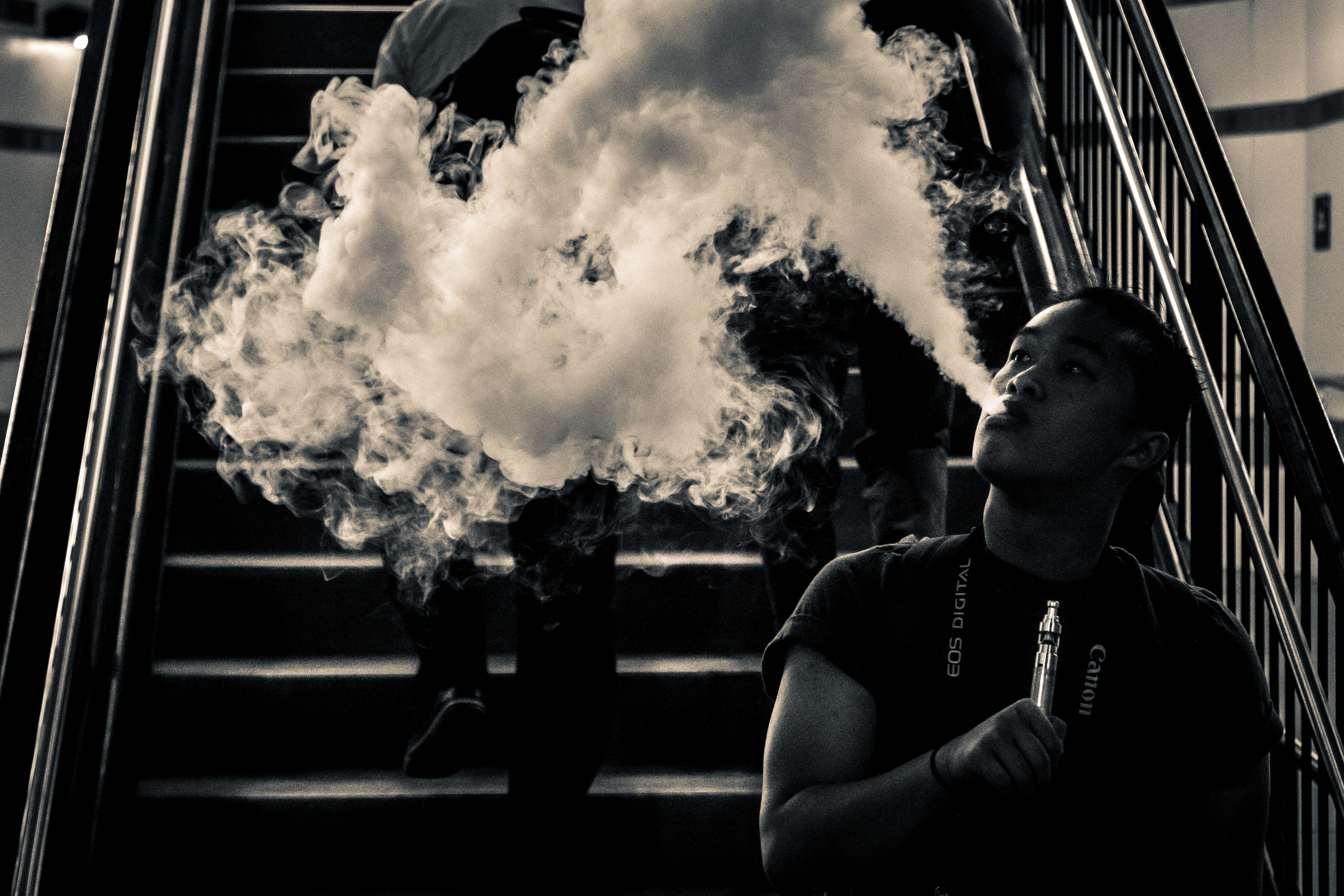
E-cigarette user blowing a cloud of aerosol (vapor). The activity is known as cloud-chasing.

Large gatherings of vapers, called vape meets, take place around the US. They focus on e-cigarette devices, accessories, and the lifestyle that accompanies them. Vapefest, which started in 2010, is an annual show hosted by different cities. People attending these meetings are usually enthusiasts that use specialized, community-made products not found in convenience stores or gas stations. These products are mostly available online or in dedicated "vape" storefronts where mainstream e-cigarettes brands from the tobacco industry and larger e-cig manufacturers are not as popular. Some vape shops have a vape bar where patrons can test out different e-liquids and socialize. The Electronic Cigarette Convention in North America which started in 2013, is an annual show where companies and consumers meet up.

A subclass of vapers configure their atomizers to produce large amounts of vapor by using low-resistance heating coils. This practice is called "cloud-chasing". By using a coil with very low resistance, the batteries are stressed to a potentially unsafe extent. This could present a risk of dangerous battery failures. As vaping comes under increased scrutiny, some members of the vaping community have voiced their concerns about cloud-chasing, stating the practice gives vapers a bad reputation when doing it in public. The Oxford Dictionaries' word of the year for 2014 was "vape".

=== Regulation ===
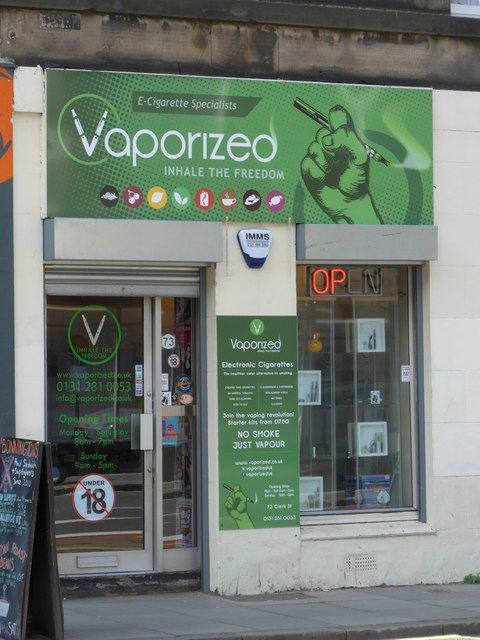
An electronic cigarette store in Edinburgh, Scotland, UK, displaying a sign banning those under the age of 18 from entering

Regulation of e-cigarettes varies across countries and states, ranging from no regulation to banning them entirely. For instance, e-cigarettes containing nicotine are illegal in Japan, forcing the market to use heated tobacco products for cigarette alternatives. Others have introduced strict restrictions and some have licensed devices as medicines such as in the UK. However, as of February 2025, there is no e-cigarette device that has been given a medical license that is commercially sold or available by prescription in the UK. As of 2015, around two thirds of major nations have regulated e-cigarettes in some way.

Because of the potential relationship with tobacco laws and medical drug policies, e-cigarette legislation is being debated in many countries. The companies that make e-cigarettes have been pushing for laws that support their interests. In 2016 the US Department of Transportation banned the use of e-cigarettes on commercial flights. This regulation applies to all flights to and from the US. In 2018, the Royal College of Physicians asked that a balance is found in regulations over e-cigarettes that ensure product safety while encouraging smokers to use them instead of tobacco, as well as keep an eye on any effects contrary to the control agencies for tobacco.

The legal status of e-cigarettes is currently pending in many countries. Many countries such as Brazil, Singapore, Uruguay, and India have banned e-cigarettes. In June 2025, Pakistan banned e-cigarettes in the province of Punjab, though the decision was reversed the next month. Canada-wide in 2014, they were technically illegal to sell, as no nicotine-containing e-cigarettes are not regulated by Health Canada, but this is generally unenforced and they are commonly available for sale Canada-wide. In 2016, Health Canada announced plans to regulate vaping products. In the US and the UK, the use and sale to adults of e-cigarettes are legal. The revised EU Tobacco Products Directive came into effect in May 2016, providing stricter regulations for e-cigarettes. It limits e-cigarette advertising in print, on television and radio, along with reducing the level of nicotine in liquids and reducing the flavors used. It does not ban vaping in public places. It requires the purchaser for e-cigarettes to be at least 18 and does not permit buying them for anyone less than 18 years of age. The updated Tobacco Products Directive has been disputed by tobacco lobbyists whose businesses could be impacted by these revisions.

The US FDA regulates e-cigarettes, e-liquid and all related products. It evaluates ingredients, product features and health risks, as well their appeal to minors and non-users. The FDA rule also bans access to minors. A photo ID is now required to buy e-cigarettes, and their sale in all-ages vending machines is not permitted in the US.

In 2016, the US FDA used its authority under the Family Smoking Prevention and Tobacco Control Act to deem e-cigarette devices and e-liquids to be tobacco products, which meant it intended to regulate the marketing, labelling, and manufacture of devices and liquids; vape shops that mix e-liquids or make or modify devices were considered manufacturing sites that needed to register with US FDA and comply with good manufacturing practice regulation. E-cigarette and tobacco companies recruited lobbyists in an effort to prevent the US FDA from evaluating e-cigarette products or banning existing products already on the market.

FDA testimony reported that legislation enacted in 2022 extended regulatory authority to nicotine from any source, including synthetic nicotine.

In February 2014, the European Parliament passed regulations requiring standardization and quality control for liquids and vaporizers, disclosure of ingredients in liquids, and child-proofing and tamper-proofing for liquid packaging. In April 2014 the US FDA published proposed regulations for e-cigarettes. In the US some states tax e-cigarettes as tobacco products, and some state and regional governments have broadened their indoor smoking bans to include e-cigarettes. As of April 2017, 12 US states and 615 localities had prohibited the use of e-cigarettes in venues in which traditional cigarette smoking was prohibited. In 2015, at least 48 states and 2 territories had banned e-cigarette sales to minors.

In November 2020, the New Zealand government passed a vaping regulation that requires vape stores to register as specialist vape retailers before they can sell e-cigarettes, the wider range of flavoured e-liquids, and other related vaping products. Vaping products are required to be notified by the government before they can be sold to ensure that the products are following safety requirements and ingredients in liquids do not contain prohibited substances.

E-cigarettes containing nicotine have been listed as drug delivery devices in a number of countries, and the marketing of such products has been restricted or put on hold until safety and efficacy clinical trials are conclusive. Since they do not contain tobacco, television advertising in the US is not restricted. Some countries have regulated e-cigarettes as a medical product even though they have not approved them as a smoking cessation aid. The emerging phenomenon of e-cigarettes has raised concerns in the health community, governments, and the general public and recommended that e-cigarettes should be regulated to protect consumers. It added, "heavy regulation by restricting access to e-cigarettes would just encourage continuing use of much unhealthier tobacco smoking." Regulation of the e-cigarette should be considered on the basis of reported adverse health effects.

=== Criticism of vaping bans ===
Vaping is much less harmful than smoking, and critics of vaping bans say that they incentivize people to return to smoking. Such arguments have featured in debates over national and subnational vaping restrictions. In Australia, federal reforms that took effect on 1 July 2024 restricted legal sales of vapes to pharmacies and banned the commercial supply of disposable and non-therapeutic vapes; critics, including industry groups and criminology experts, warned that the restrictions could expand an illicit market for vaping products if demand persisted while legal access narrowed. In the United Kingdom, government impact assessment work and contemporaneous media coverage around the planned 2025 ban on sales of single-use vapes included warnings that some vapers could revert or relapse to smoking tobacco. Subsequent reporting in The BMJ scrutinized widely circulated claims that a disposable-vape ban would result in approximately 200,000 additional smokers. Additionally, San Francisco's chief economist, Ted Egan, when discussing the San Francisco vaping ban said that the city's ban on e-cigarette sales would increase smoking as vapers switch to combustible cigarettes. Critics of smoking bans stress the absurdity of criminalizing the sale of a safer alternative to tobacco while tobacco continues to be legal. In New Zealand, critics responded to a March 2024 ban on disposable e-cigarettes, stating that banning disposables could drive some people return to smoking and encourage a black market for unregulated vaping products. Prominent proponents of smoking bans are not in favor of criminalizing tobacco either, but rather allowing consumers to have the choice to choose whatever products they desire.

In 2022, after two years of review, the Food and Drug Administration (FDA) denied Juul's application to keep its tobacco and menthol flavored vaping products on the market. Critics of this denial noted that research published in Nicotine and Tobacco Research found that smokers who transitioned to Juul products in North America were significantly more likely to switch to vaping than those in the United Kingdom who only had access to lower-strength nicotine products. They also noted that vaping does not contain many of the components that make smoking dangerous such as the combustion process and certain chemicals that are present in cigarettes that are not present in vape products. In addition to these arguments, some critics have cited recent empirical research on policy impacts. In the United States, a 2024 quasi-experimental analysis of survey data published in JAMA Health Forum reported that state restrictions on flavored e-cigarette sales were associated with reduced daily vaping but increased daily cigarette smoking among adults aged 18–29. A 2025 study in the Journal of Health Economics similarly reported evidence consistent with substitution from flavored ENDS to cigarettes among certain age groups following the adoption of ENDS flavor restrictions.

=== Product liability ===
The US Fire Administration says electronic cigarettes have been combusting and injuring people and surrounding areas. The composition of a cigarette is the cause of this, as the cartridges that contain the liquid mixture are so close to the battery. A research report by the US Fire Administration supports this, stating that, "Unlike mobile phones, some e-cigarette lithium-ion batteries within e-cigarettes offer no protection to stop the coil overheating".

Peer-reviewed medical literature has also documented characteristic injury patterns associated with e-cigarette explosions and battery failures. A 2023 retrospective burn center study reported that typical injury locations included the groin region, hands, and face, and that many cases required surgical treatment.

Beyond individual case reports, population-level surveillance data have also been used to estimate the frequency of e-cigarette-related injuries. A 2024 analysis of US emergency department surveillance data estimated that there were 3,142 ED-treated ENDS/ENNDS product-related injuries from 2012 to 2022.

In response to reports of battery-related fires and explosions, US regulators have issued consumer safety guidance. The US Food and Drug Administration has also issued consumer guidance on reducing battery fire and explosion risks, noting that "vape fires and explosions are dangerous" and providing recommendations on charging, storage, and handling.

Since the publication of these early reports, the structure of the e-cigarette market has evolved. Subsequent industry developments have included the involvement of major tobacco companies in the e-cigarette market through subsidiaries and acquisitions; for example, British American Tobacco's U.S. unit Reynolds American markets Vuse products, and in 2023 Altria acquired NJOY's e-vapor product portfolio.

In parallel with regulatory scrutiny and industry consolidation, e-cigarette manufacturers have faced significant product liability and consumer protection litigation. In April 2023, Juul Labs agreed to pay $462 million to settle claims brought by six U.S. states and the District of Columbia alleging unlawful marketing of its products to minors.

Public safety concerns related to lithium ion batteries have also extended beyond consumer use to storage, disposal, and waste handling. Public safety authorities have warned about fire risks associated with lithium ion batteries in disposable e-cigarettes during storage, disposal and waste handling. Ahead of the United Kingdom's disposable vape ban taking effect in June 2025, the Local Government Association cautioned that lithium batteries inside disposable vapes could pose a fire and risk-to-life hazard if not stored correctly.

In the UK, these concerns have been reflected in government and media reporting on waste-related fires. In 2025, reporting linked discarded single use vapes to fires in waste collection vehicles and recycling facilities, citing warning from the Department for Environment, Food & Rural Affairs and estimates of more than 1,200 battery-related fires at waste sites in 2023.

=== Marketing ===
They are marketed to people as being safer than traditional cigarettes. They are also marketed to non-smokers. E-cigarette marketing is common. There are growing concerns that e-cigarette advertising campaigns unjustifiably focus on young adults, adolescents, and women. Large tobacco companies have greatly increased their marketing efforts. This marketing trend may expand the use of e-cigarettes and contribute to re-glamorizing smoking. Some companies may use e-cigarette advertising to advocate smoking, deliberately, or inadvertently, is an area of concern. The e-cigarette companies have expanded using aggressive marketing messages like those used to promote cigarettes in the 1950s and 1960s.

E-cigarette companies are using methods that were once used by the tobacco industry to persuade young people to start using cigarettes. E-cigarettes are promoted to a certain extent to forge a vaping culture that entices non-smokers. Themes in e-cigarette marketing, including sexual content and customer satisfaction, are parallel to themes and techniques that are appealing to young people and young adults in traditional cigarette advertising and promotion. A 2017 review found "The tobacco industry sees a future where ENDS accompany and perpetuate, rather than supplant, tobacco use, especially targeting the youth." E-cigarettes and nicotine are regularly promoted as safe and even healthy in the media and on brand websites, which is an area of concern.

While advertising of tobacco products is banned in most countries, television and radio e-cigarette advertising in several countries may be indirectly encouraging traditional cigarette use. E-cigarette advertisements are also in magazines, newspapers, online, and in retail stores. Between 2010 and 2014, e-cigarettes were second only to cigarettes as the top advertised product in magazines. As cigarette companies have acquired the largest e-cigarette brands, they currently benefit from a dual market of smokers and e-cigarette users while simultaneously presenting themselves as agents of harm reduction. This raises concerns about the appropriateness of endorsing a product that directly profits the tobacco industry. There is no evidence that the cigarette brands are selling e-cigarettes as part of a plan to phase out traditional cigarettes, despite some stating to want to cooperate in "harm reduction". E-cigarette advertising for using e-cigarettes as a quitting tool have been seen in the US, UK, and China, which have not been supported by regulatory bodies.

In the US, six large e-cigarette businesses spent $59.3 million on promoting e-cigarettes in 2013. In the US and Canada, over $2 million is spent yearly on promoting e-cigarettes online. E-cigarette websites often made unscientific health statements in 2012. The ease to get past the age verification system at e-cigarette company websites allows underage individuals to access and be exposed to marketing. Around half of e-cigarette company websites have a minimum age notice that prohibited underage individuals from entering.

Celebrity endorsements are used to encourage e-cigarette use. Opponents of the tobacco industry state that the Blu advertisement, in a context of longstanding prohibition of tobacco advertising on television, seems to have resorted to advertising tactics that got former generations of people in the US addicted to traditional cigarettes.

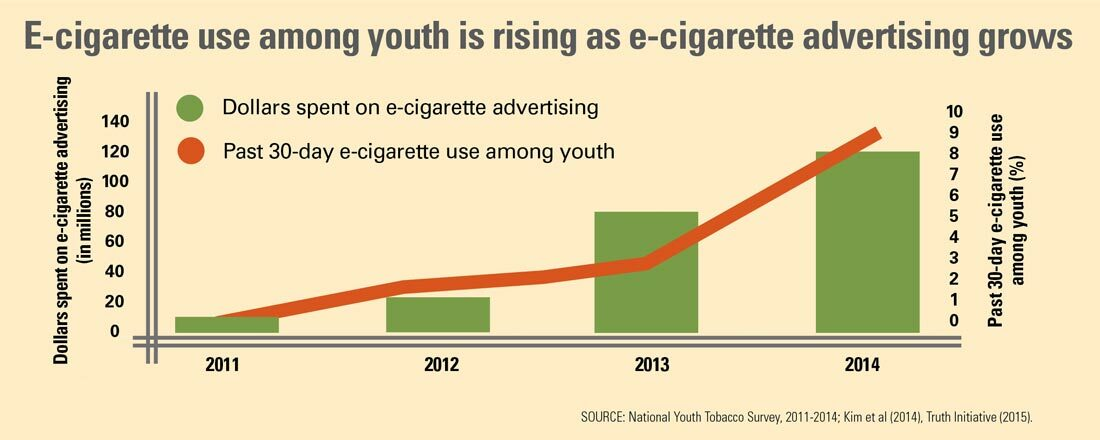
From 2011 to 2014, e-cigarette use among young people in the US was rising as e-cigarette advertising increased.

Since at least 2007, e-cigarettes have been heavily promoted across media outlets globally. They are vigorously advertised, mostly through the Internet, as a safe substitute to traditional cigarettes, among other things. E-cigarette companies promote their e-cigarette products on Facebook, Instagram, YouTube, and Twitter. They are promoted on YouTube by movies with sexual material and music icons, who encourage minors to "take their freedom back." They have partnered with a number of sports and music icons to promote their products. Tobacco companies intensely market e-cigarettes to young people, with industry strategies including cartoon characters and candy flavors. Fruit flavored e-liquid is the most commonly marketed e-liquid flavor on social media.

E-cigarette companies commonly promote that their products contain only water, nicotine, glycerin, propylene glycol, and flavoring, but this assertion is misleading as researchers have found differing amounts of heavy metals in the vapor, including chromium, nickel, tin, silver, cadmium, mercury, and aluminum. The United States Centers for Disease Control and Prevention (CDC) explicitly states that e‑cigarette aerosol is not harmless "water vapor." Evidence demonstrates that e‑cigarette aerosol contains potentially harmful chemicals such as nicotine, carbonyls, metals, and volatile organic compounds, alongside fine particulate matter (PM2.5). These ultrafine particles are small enough to bypass respiratory defenses and be inhaled deep into the lungs, where they can enter the bloodstream and are associated with severe systemic inflammation, cardiovascular disease, and premature death.

Many e-cigarette companies market their products as a smoking cessation aid without evidence of effectiveness. E-cigarette marketing has been found to make unsubstantiated health statements (e.g., that they help one quit smoking) including statements about improving psychiatric symptoms, which may be particularly appealing to smokers with mental illness. E-cigarette marketing advocate weight control and emphasize use of nicotine with many flavors. These marketing angles could particularly entice overweight people, young people, and vulnerable groups. Some e-cigarette companies state that their products are green without supporting evidence which may be purely to increase their sales.

=== Economics ===
The number of e-cigarettes sold increased every year from 2003 to 2014. As of 2014, there were at least 466 e-cigarette brands. Worldwide e-cigarette sales in 2014 were around US$7 billion. Worldwide e-cigarette sales in 2019 were about $19.3 billion. In 2021, the global e-cigarette market was estimated at about US$20.4 billion. In the United States, Reuters reported (citing Circana retail tracking reviewed by Reuters) that illegal sales of flavored disposable vapes reached about $2.4 billion in 2024 and accounted for roughly 35% of all e-cigarette sales in mainstream retail outlets tracked by Circana; Circana estimated the total tracked vape market at $6.8 billion, excluding online and specialty store sales. E-cigarette sales could exceed traditional cigarette sales by 2023.

==== Sales channels and measurement ====
Approximately 30–50% of total e-cigarettes sales are handled on the internet. In the United States, the Federal Trade Commission reported that, for major manufacturers it surveyed, direct sales accounted for 8.13% of reported e-cigarette sales in 2019 and 7.09% in 2020, with most reported sales occurring indirectly through retail channels.

Retail-sales datasets used in market reporting may also exclude online and specialty vape-shop channels.

Industry structure and supply chains

Established tobacco companies have a significant share of the e-cigarette market.

As of 2018, 95% of e-cigarette devices were made in China, mainly in Shenzhen. More recent policy reporting and official analysis continue to link a substantial share of product supply to imported devices, including from China, as well as to cross-border e-commerce channels for some products. Chinese companies' market share of e-liquid is low. In 2014, online and offline sales started to increase. Since combustible cigarettes are relatively inexpensive in China a lower price may not be a large factor in marketing vaping products over there.

Large tobacco retailers are leading the cigalike market. "We saw the market's sudden recognition that the cigarette industry seems to be in serious trouble, disrupted by the rise of vaping," Mad Money's Jim Cramer stated April 2018. "Over the course of three short days, the tobacco stocks were bent, they were spindled and they were mutilated by the realization that electronic cigarettes have become a serious threat to the old-school cigarette makers," he added. In 2019, a vaping industry organization released a report stating that a possible US ban on e-cigarettes flavors can potentially effect greater than 150,000 jobs around the US.

==== United States market (brands, formats, and recent changes) ====
The leading seller in the e-cigarette market in the US is the Juul e-cigarette, which was introduced in June 2015. As of August 2018, Juul accounts for over 72% of the US e-cigarette market monitored by Nielsen, and its closest competitor—RJ Reynolds' Vuse—makes up less than 10% of the market. Juul rose to popularity quickly, growing by 700% in 2016 alone. On 17 July 2018 Reynolds announced it will debut in August 2018 a pod mod type device similar Juul. The popularity of the Juul pod system has led to a flood of other pod devices hitting the market.

Since 2018 the US e-cigarette market has shifted. During January 2020-December 2022, disposable cigarette unit share increased from 24.7% to 51.8%, while prefilled cartridge share decreased from 75.2% to 48.0%. For the four-week period ending December 25, 2022, the top-selling brands were Vuse, JUUL, Elf Bar, NJOY, and Breeze Smoke.

In the 52 weeks ended June 15, 2024, Vuse Alto products represented approximately 40% of U.S. e-cigarette sales in stores tracked by NielsenIQ, according to an analyst cited by The Wall Street Journal. In the US the Federal Trade Commission reported that e-cigarette product sales for major reporting manufacturers rose to $2.703 billion in 2019 and then declined to $2.224 billion in 2020, with the FTC noting this may reflect a shift to other market participants. In US retail scanner data, the number of e-cigarette brands increased from 184 in January 2020 to 269 in December 2022. In 2024, circana tracked approximately 11,000 unauthorized flavored disposable vape products in U.S. mainstream retail outlets, according to data reviewed by Reuters. In 2024, illegal sales of flavored disposable vapes reached about $2.4 billion and accounted for roughly 35% of all e-cigarette sales in mainstream retail outlets. According to data reviewed by Reuters, Circana estimated the total tracked vape market at $6.8 billion, excluding online and specialty store sales. A 2025 lawsuit by New York's attorney general cited testimony that one distributor sold more than $132 million worth of Elf Bar e-cigarettes in the prior year. Altria Group, one of the largest tobacco companies in the United States and the owner of Philip Morris USA, has significant investments in the domestic e-cigarette market. In January 2025, Altria said it was reassessing its 2028 "smoke-free" volume and revenue goals, citing competition from disposable vapes, and estimated that illicit disposable products represent 60% or more of the U.S. e-cigarette category despite lacking required authorizations. US authorities reported intensified enforcement actions against unauthorized e-cigarettes in 2025, including seizures of 4.7 million units valued at $86.5 million in a Chicago-based operation; US agencies also reported blocking more than 6 million unauthorized e-cigarettes worth over $120 million that year.

==== Canada, United Kingdom, and Europe ====
In Canada, e-cigarettes had an estimated value of 140 million CAD in 2015. There are numerous e-cigarette retail shops in Canada. A 2014 audit of retailers in four Canadian cities found that 94% of grocery stores, convenience stores, and tobacconist shops which sold e-cigarettes sold nicotine-free varieties only, while all vape shops stocked at least one nicotine-containing product.

By 2015, the e-cigarette market had only reached a twentieth of the size of the tobacco market in the UK. In the UK in 2015 the "most prominent brands of cigalikes" were owned by tobacco companies, however, with the exception of one model, all the tank types came from "non-tobacco industry companies". Yet some tobacco industry products, while using prefilled cartridges, resemble tank models.

By 2023, 1 survey by the Local Data Company counted 3,573 specialist vape shops in the UK, and NIQ data cited in press reporting put value sales of vaping products in Britain at £897.4 million. Sky News similarly reported that more than 230 independent vape shops opened in 2023, citing the same Local Data Company survey.

France's e-cigarette market was estimated by Groupe Xerfi to be €130 million in 2015. Additionally, France's e-liquid market was estimated at €265 million. In December 2015, there were 2,400 vape shops in France, 400 fewer than in March of the same year. Industry organization Fivape said the reduction was due to consolidation, not to reduced demand.

In the United Kingdom, a new excise duty on vaping products (Vaping Products Duty) is scheduled to take effect from 1 October 2026, with registrations opening on 1 April 2026, following consultation. The government said it would implement a flat-rate structure of £2.20 per 10 mL of vaping liquid, alongside a one-off increase in tobacco duty to preserve the financial incentive to switch from smoking to vaping.

==== Vietnam and wide tobacco-related costs ====
In Vietnam, the e-cigarette market is growing rapidly, with the use rate increasing 18 times from 2015 to 2020. The use rate of e-cigarettes in adolescents aged 13–15 is 3.5%, up 1.6% from 2019. According to estimates by the World Health Organization (WHO), the global economic losses caused by tobacco each year are $1.4 trillion. Economic losses caused by tobacco are estimated to account for 1% of GDP. The Vietnamese government is making efforts to control the e-cigarette market. However, here are still many challenges to be addressed, such as consumer's lack of understanding of the harm of e-cigarettes, unclear legal regulations, and fierce competition from imported e-cigarette products.

== Environmental impact ==
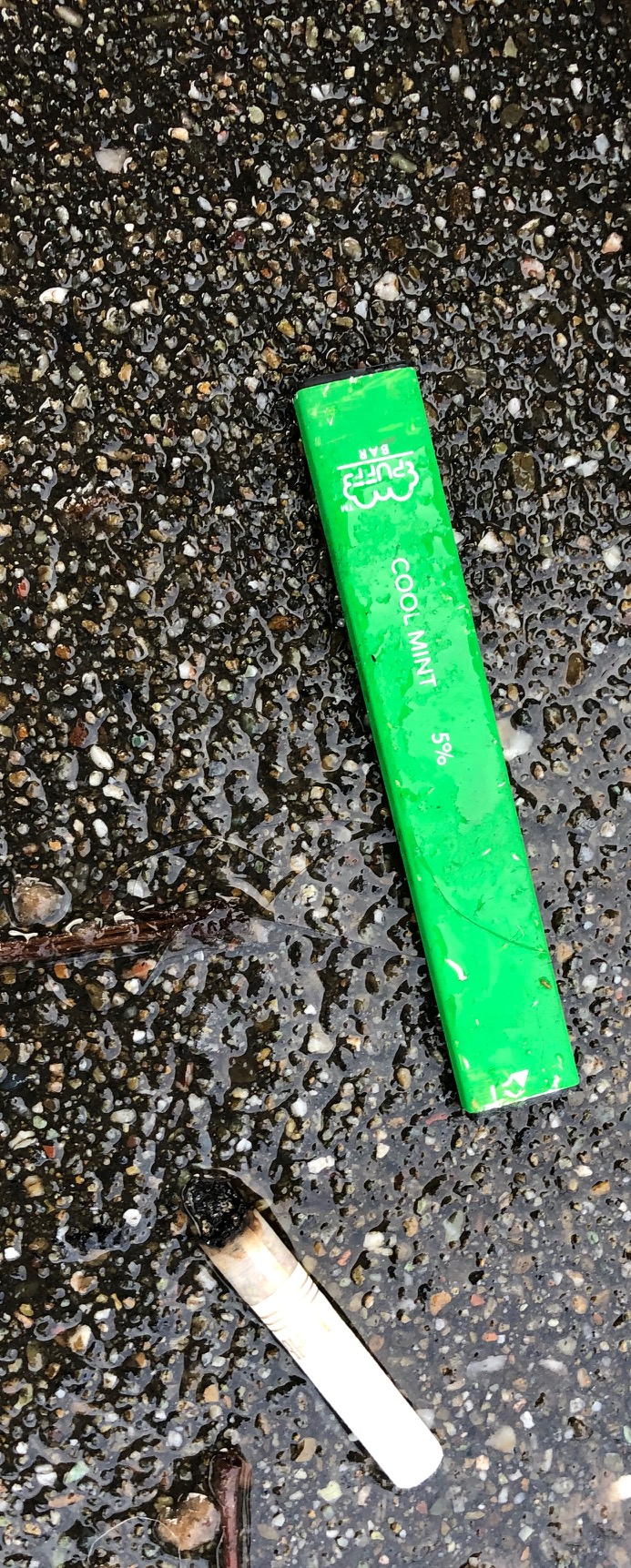
A discarded e-cigarette next to a traditional cigarette in a car park

Compared to traditional cigarettes, reusable e-cigarettes do not create waste and potential litter from every use in the form of discarded cigarette butts. Traditional cigarettes tend to end up in the ocean where they cause pollution, though once discarded they undergo biodegradation and photodegradation.

A 2025 review in Nicotine & Tobacco Research concluded that the chemical, metallic and electrical composition of e-cigarettes could qualify them as hazardous and electronic waste, and recommended clear, enforceable disposal and recycling requirements, including manufacturer responsibility and consumer-facing recycling information, in jurisdictions where e-cigarettes are legally sold.

E-cigarettes that are not reusable contribute to the problem of electronic waste, which can create a hazard for people and other organisms. If improperly disposed of, they can release heavy metals, nicotine, and other chemicals from batteries and unused e-liquid. A 2024 open-access study in Science of the Total Environment that dismantled nine popular disposable vapes reported a complex mix of plastics and metals, including toxic or potentially toxic elements such as lead and mercury, which the authors noted could pose environmental hazards through leaching after littering or landfilling. A July 2018–April 2019 garbology study found e-cigarette products composed 19% of the waste from all traditional and electronic tobacco and cannabis products collected at 12 public high schools in Northern California.

In December 2024, research commissioned by the UK recycling charity Material Focus estimated that 13 vapes were being thrown away every second in the UK, amounting to over a million per day, and that approximately 8.2 million vapes a week were discarded or recycled incorrectly, with growth linked to larger "big puff" devices. Research led by University College London and the University of Oxford reported that lithium-ion cells inside some disposable vapes can retain high capacity after hundreds of charge-discharge cycles, underscoring resource waste and the importance of proper collection and recycling of embedded batteries. Recycling challenges, waste issues, and fire hazards are cited. Concerns about youth vaping are also raised. The UK Vaping Industry Association defends disposables as quitting aids and warns of potential black market products if banned. Although some brands have begun recycling services for their e-cigarette cartridges and batteries, the prevalence of recycling is unknown.

A 2024 UK study reported that only a minority of surveyed retailers provided recycling points despite existing legal obligations, and estimated that more than 250 million disposable vapes could be discarded before regulatory restrictions came into force.

Several jurisdictions subsequently moved to restrict or ban single-use (disposable) vapes while allowing reusable products, citing environmental and waste concerns. In Australia, imports of disposable vapes were prohibited from 1 January 2024 under new import controls. Belgium banned the sale of disposable vapes from 1 January 2025, becoming the first EU member state to do so. In France, parliament voted in February 2025 to ban single-use e-cigarettes, citing environmental impacts alongside public health concerns.

In the United Kingdom, a ban on the sale and supply of single-use vapes took effect on 1 June 2025 while permitting the sale of reusable products, and government guidance states that vape sellers must offer a Waste Electrical and Electronic Equipment (WEEE) take-back service for returned vapes and parts.

In November 2025, the Irish government approved publication of the Public Health (Single Use Vapes) Bill 2025, intended to prohibit the retail sale of disposable vapes following enactment.

In September 2025, a "non-reusable" electronic cigarette was salvaged to demonstrate a web server hosting a website by Bogdan Ionescu.

== Related technologies ==
Other devices to deliver inhaled nicotine have been developed. They aim to mimic the ritual and behavioral aspects of traditional cigarettes.

British American Tobacco, through their subsidiary Nicoventures, licensed a nicotine delivery system based on existing asthma inhaler technology from UK-based healthcare company Kind Consumer. In September 2014 a product based on this named Voke obtained approval from the United Kingdom's Medicines and Healthcare Products Regulatory Agency.

In 2011, Philip Morris International bought the rights to a nicotine pyruvate technology developed by Jed Rose at Duke University. The technology is based on the chemical reaction between pyruvic acid and nicotine, which produces an inhalable nicotine pyruvate vapor. Philip Morris Products S.A. created a different kind e-cigarette named P3L. The device is supplied with a cartridge that contains nicotine and lactic acid in different cavities. When turned on and heated, the nicotine salt called nicotine lactate forms an aerosol.

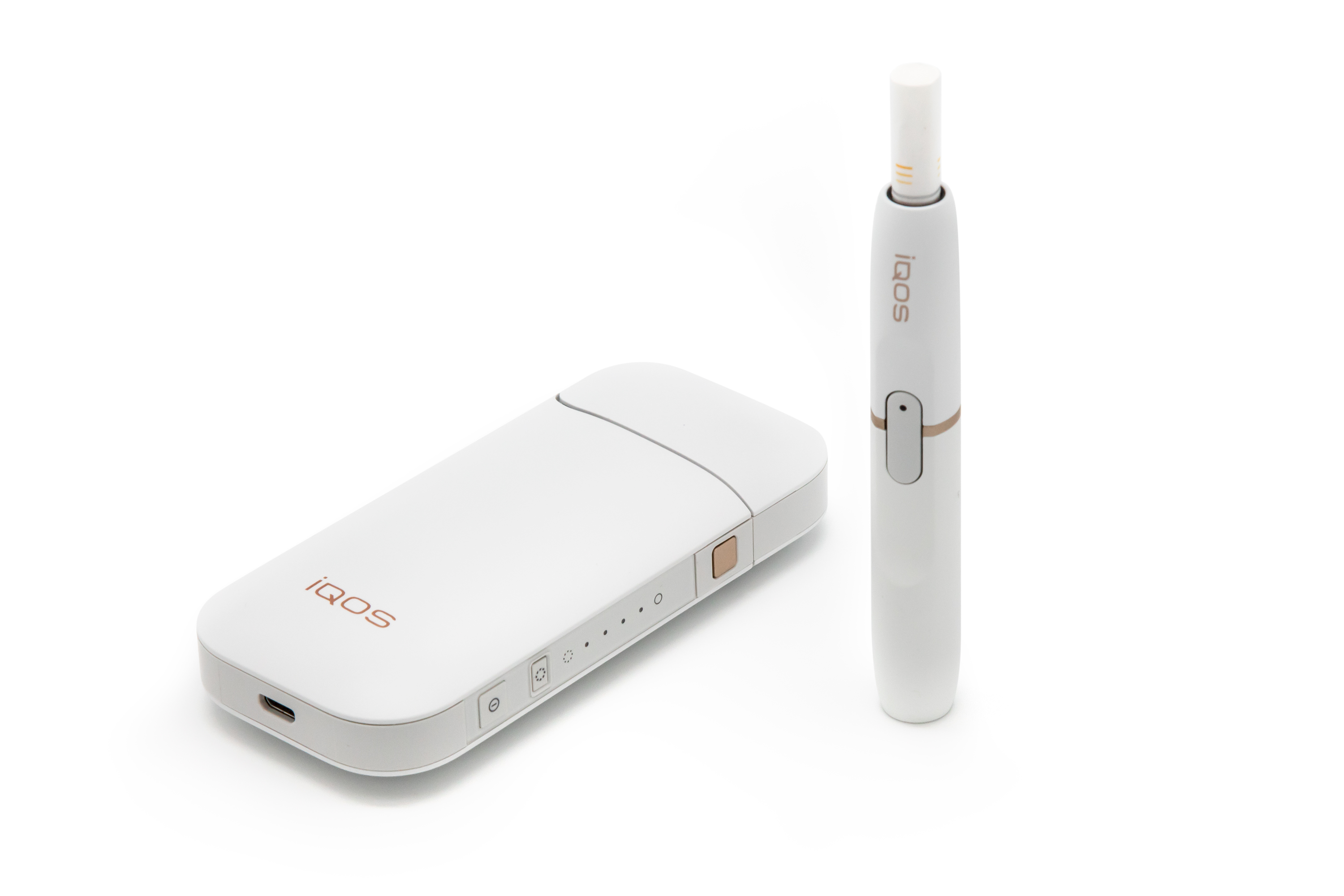
Philip Morris International's IQOS device with charger and tobacco stick

The IQOS is a heated tobacco product marketed by Philip Morris International. It heats tobacco at a lower temperature than traditional cigarettes. The tobacco sticks reach a temperature up to 350 °C. It sold first in Japan since November 2014. In December 2016, the United Tobacco Vapor Group's (UTVG) stated that they have been given a patent for their vaporizing component system. QMOS from UTVG does not contain a wick or sponge and the number of components is 5 compared to 20 for traditional e-cigarettes.

Pax Labs has developed vaporizers that heats the leaves of tobacco to deliver nicotine in a vapor. In June 2015, they introduced Juul, a type of e-cigarette which delivers 10 times as much nicotine as other e-cigarettes, equivalent to an actual cigarette puff. Juul was spun off from Pax Labs in June 2017 and is now available by the independent company Juul Labs. The eTron 3T from Vapor Tobacco Manufacturing, launched in December 2014, employs a patented, aqueous system whereby the tobacco is extracted into water. The e-liquid contains organic tobacco, organic glycerin, and water.

In December 2013, Japan Tobacco launched Ploom in Japan. In January 2016, they launched Ploom TECH that produces a vapor from a heated liquid that moves through a capsule of granulated tobacco leaves. In 2016, British American Tobacco (BAT) released its own version of the heat but not burn technology called glo in Japan and Switzerland. It uses tobacco sticks rather than nicotine liquid, and does not directly heat or burn tobacco. Heated tobacco products were first introduced in 1988, but were not a commercial success.

BLOW started selling e-hookahs, an electronic version of the hookah in 2014. The handle of each hose for the e-hookah contains a heating element and a liquid, which produces vapor. Gopal Bhatnagar, based in Toronto, Canada, invented a 3D printed adapter to turn a traditional hookah into an e-hookah. It is used instead of the ceramic bowl that contains shisha tobacco. Rather than the tobacco, users can insert e-cigarettes.

Other non‑nicotine aerosol‑generating devices use technology similar to that of electronic cigarettes. Fog machines and haze machines, commonly used in entertainment venues, heat glycol‑based liquids to produce aerosols for visual effects. Industry standards organizations note that the droplets produced by theatrical fog and haze fall within the size range of particulate matter (PM2.5), a classification based on particle diameter. Recent research has shown that heating glycol‑based fluids in both fog and haze machines and electronic cigarettes can produce similar thermal degradation byproducts, including carbonyl compounds such as formaldehyde.

== Vaping of drugs other than nicotine ==
Some vape pens, generally not referred to as "e-cigarettes", contain cannabis derivatives instead of nicotine and tobacco derivatives. Some cannabis pens, known as "dab pens", contain cannabis extracted using butane as solvent ("butane hash oil"). Other vaporizers contain e-liquid made with pure THC, and they generally resemble conventional e-cigarettes. A 2020 study shows that one third of teenagers engaged in conventional, tobacco vaping also engage in THC vaping.

KanaVape is an e-cigarette containing cannabidiol (CBD) and no THC. Several companies including Canada's Eagle Energy Vapor are selling caffeine-based e-cigarettes instead of containing nicotine. Some e-cigarettes marketed as being "nicotine-free" have been found to instead contain the nicotine analogue 6-methylnicotine, which is more potent and may be more addictive than nicotine itself.

More broadly, vape pens and e-liquids have become increasingly widely used as a delivery mechanism for a wide variety of illicit and designer drugs. These can include stimulants such as methamphetamine and cocaine, opioids such as fentanyl analogs and nitazenes, a wide variety of synthetic cannabinoids as well as semi-synthetic cannabinoids derived from THC, sedatives including benzodiazepines like etizolam as well as etomidate and methaqualone, psychedelics such as NBOMe substituted phenethylamine derivatives, dissociatives such as ketamine, and assorted other compounds.

== See also ==
- Vaping cessation
