= Elf Bar =

Chinese brand of electronic cigarettes

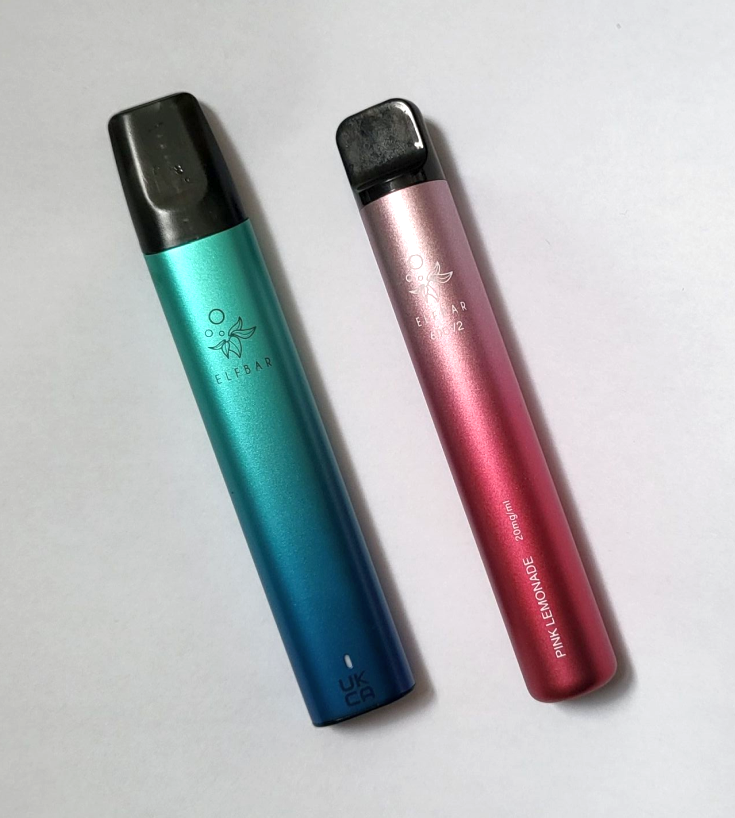
- A pair of Elf Bar pen devices: a reusable Mate 500 (with an inserted pod) and a single-use lemonade flavour 600
- Product type: Electronic cigarette
- Current owner: Zhang Shengwei
- Produced by: Shenzhen iMiracle Technology
- Country: China
- Introduced: 2018; 8 years ago
- Related brands: Lost Mary
- Markets: Germany, United Kingdom, Spain, United Arab Emirates
- Tagline: Make it elf, enjoy yourself
- Website: elfbar.com

Elf Bar (stylized ELFBAR, also sold in some markets as EBDesign or EBCreate) is a Chinese brand of electronic cigarettes produced by Shenzhen iMiracle Technology, a part of Heaven Gifts. These vapor products are characterized by their fruity flavors and colorful appearance. Elf Bar is, as of 2023, the most popular brand for disposable e-cigarettes in the world. Reusable variants are also marketed.

== Products ==
The best known Elf Bar e-cig is the disposable Elf Bar 600 which comes with a pre-filled tank of 20 mg of nicotine salt in various flavours. Elf Bar BC 500 is a box-style alternative disposable. Its manufacturer also produces a number of reusable and rechargeable Elf Bar devices, including the pod-based Mate 500, ELFA, the 1200, and more advanced variants such as the Elf Bar ELFX.

== Appearance and flavors ==
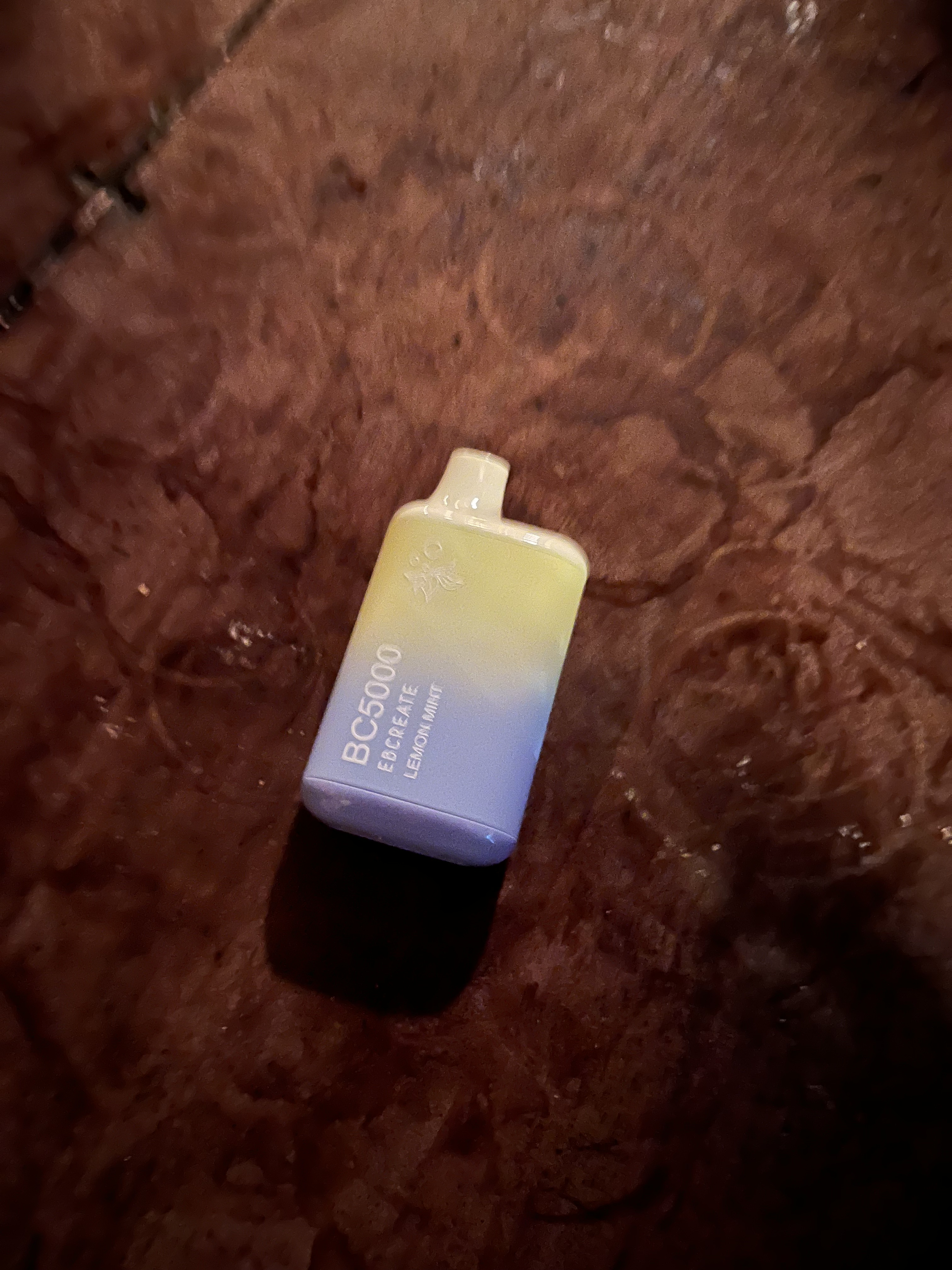
A lemon-mint Elf Bar branded as EBCreate.

Unlike the Juul, which gained popularity throughout the late 2010s, Elf Bars have a colorful appearance. Many of them have fruity flavors like piña colada, strawberry mango, and lemon mint, and in 2023, the New York Times called Elf Bar the "vape du jour." The aesthetic has been mimicked by similar products, such as Flum Pebble, Juicy Bar, Air Bar Nex, and its sister brand Lost Mary.

According to the Centers for Disease Control's 2023 National Youth Tobacco Survey, it is the most popular electronic cigarette brand among middle school and high school students who vape. The FDA's tobacco center chief, Brian King, said "if it looks glamorous and it looks appealing, that’s going to be the first driver that will bring a horse to water... the flavors then get them to drink. And the nicotine keeps them coming back for more."

According to psychiatrist Susan Linn, the appearance of Elf Bars is attractive to children and teenagers, who are interested in rounded shapes and colorful items. She compares the marketing to the cigarette mascot Joe Camel, who was made to appeal to young people. There are concerns that the popularity of e-cigarette devices has negated the progress of numerous attempts in the late 20th century to discourage young adults and children from using nicotine products, and has actually increased teenage nicotine consumption in general.

== Sales ==
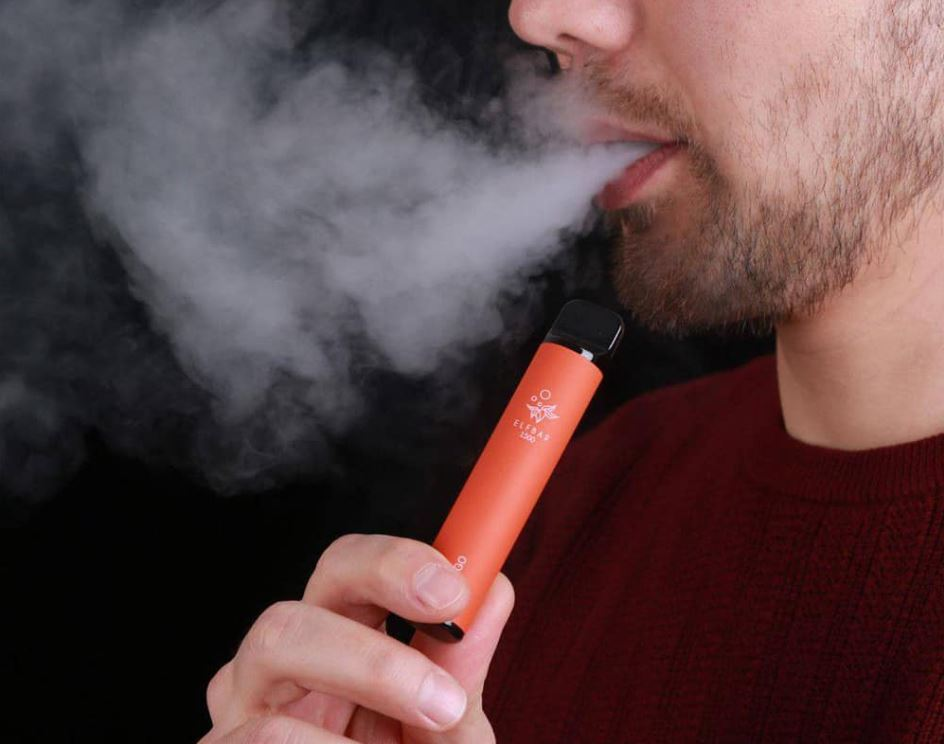
A mango flavoured Elf Bar 1500 disposable being used.

Elf Bar has been sold in the United States since November 2021 despite having no authorization from the Food and Drug Administration. Despite its legal status, it is the most popular disposable vape in the United States and the third-best selling e-cigarette overall, behind Vuse and Juul, as of 2023, according to researchers from the CDC and the nonprofit Truth Initiative. Due to a trademark dispute, the Elf Bar name has been dropped and the vapes are now sold as EB Create in the U.S. market.

The brand has become the best-selling for disposables globally, and its manufacturer Shenzhen iMiracle has been expected to generate up to $4 billion in the year 2023.

Elf Bar is also a leading e-cigarette brand in the United Kingdom, making up more than half of disposable vape sales in the country, with its sister brand Lost Mary. These brands sold over £900 million worth of vapes in 12 months, equivalent to around 160 million units, according to NielsenIQ. The Elf Bar 600 had a 55% market share for disposables in 2023 and in second place was its sister product Lost Mary BM600 with 23%, therefore giving a huge overall share for Shenzhen iMiracle. In the market for cartridge based reusables, Elf Bar Mate had a share of 13%, behind Vuse and Juul.

== Legal status in the U.S. ==
In early 2020, the FDA imposed legislation to restrict the flavors of reusable vapes to menthol and tobacco – an effort that targeted companies such as Juul. However, the flavor restriction did not apply to disposable vapes. Elf Bar hit shelves in the US by November 2021, sold in flavors like cotton candy.

Elf Bar devices have not received authorization from the Food and Drug Administration and are not legally permitted to be sold in the United States. In May 2023, US Customs seized shipments of disposable electronic cigarettes including Elf Bar that had arrived at US ports.

The FDA has taken steps to stop stores from distributing the product. On 22 June 2023, the FDA sent warning letters to 189 retailers selling fruit and candy-flavored disposable vapes, such as Elf Bar.

In Oct 2025, IMiracle (HK) Ltd., the owners and manufacturers of Elf Bar disposable vapes, have settled a lawsuit brought by Altria Group vape subsidiary NJOY, agreeing to no longer sell or distribute flavored vapes within the state of California.

== Corporate operations ==
At the 2022 GT World Challenge Asia, Elf Bar sponsored a team from Hong Kong.
