= Dragonite International =

Chinese pharmaceuticals company

Dragonite International Limited
- Native name: 如煙集團有限公司
- Type: Public
- Industry: Pharmaceuticals industry
- Founded: Hong Kong, People's Republic of China (2003)
- Headquarters: Hong Kong, People's Republic of China
- Key people: Wong Yin Chen: Chairman and CEO; Lik Hon: co-funder and Chief executive officer Hei Lin Wong: Vice-President
- Products: health care products pharmaceutical products electronic cigarettes
- Number of employees: 1,500
- Website: Dragonite International Limited official website

Dragonite International
- Traditional Chinese: 如煙集團有限公司
- Simplified Chinese: 如烟集团有限公司
Transcriptions
Standard Mandarin
- Hanyu Pinyin: rúyān Jítuán Yǒuxiàn Gōngsī

Dragonite International Limited, formerly known as Ruyan Group (Holdings) Limited, and initially, Golden Dragon Group (Holdings), is a health care and pharmaceutical company. In 2013, Imperial Tobacco purchased Dragonite's electronic cigarette division.

== History ==
Hon Lik (now Ruyan America's Chairman) patented a design using high-frequency electronics and is the original inventor of the first e-cigarettes sold (2003) and Ruyan has registered patents in more than 40 countries since 2003. Ruyan began to form the idea for the electronic cigarette in 2000.

In 2003, SBT was established, and the first patent was registered in the same year in China. In 2007, Ruyan's first international patent was registered. The patent was later granted in the United States as well.

In May 2004, Ruyan's cigar-series was launched and sold in the People's Republic of China market. In October of the same year, the e-pipe series of Ruyan was launched. As for electronic cigarette products, the "V8" Model, which more closely resembles the appearance of traditional cigarettes, was the key product for 2007. At the end of 2007, Ruyan launched a new one-time use cigar product (named "RUYAN e-Gar" in Europe, Africa, the Middle East and Asia/Pacific and RUYAN Vegas in the Americas).

In June 2007, the Group - currently known as "SBT Investment (Holdings) Limited"- acquired the entire share structure of Best Partners Worldwide Limited – the former entity that was established for the manufacturing and sales of electronic atomizing cigarettes. The Group takes an active position in developing the domestic and overseas markets under the brand name of "Ruyan" (simplified Chinese: 如烟; traditional Chinese: 如煙; pinyin: rúyān).

In 2013, Imperial Tobacco acquired the intellectual property owned by Hon Lik through Dragonite for $US 75 million.

The history of e-cigarettes and vaping traces back to 1963 when Herbert A. Gilbert patented the first “smokeless non-tobacco cigarette,” though it never gained commercial success. The modern e-cigarette was invented in 2003 by Hon Lik, a Chinese pharmacist, who sought a safer alternative to smoking after his father’s death from lung cancer. His design, commercialized by Ruyan in 2004, used a piezoelectric element to vaporize nicotine liquid, laying the foundation for the global vaping industry. By the 2010s, e-cigarettes evolved with battery-powered heating coils, refillable tanks, and customizable mods, making them more efficient and user-friendly. The late 2010s saw the rise of pod systems like JUUL, which used salt nicotine for a smoother experience, further popularizing vaping.

Vaping quickly grew from a smoking cessation tool into a cultural phenomenon, with communities forming around cloud-chasing, flavor experimentation, and device customization. However, its rapid rise also sparked regulatory and health debates. Governments worldwide implemented restrictions to address youth usage and safety concerns, while public health organizations debated its role as a harm-reduction tool.

== Product development ==
=== Ruyan Ruyan V8 (electronic cigarette) ===
The Ruyan V8 is an electronic cigarette (e-cigarette) invention and production of Ruyan Group (Holdings) Limited. It was first manufactured and launched in the Chinese market in 2006. The Ruyan V8 atomizes a solution-mixture that may or may not contain nicotine; it produces a vapor.

=== Ruyan E-pipe (electronic pipe) ===
The Ruyan e-pipe was first manufactured and launched in the Chinese market in 2004. It is a non-flammable atomizing electronic pipe that performs the same functions and features as an ordinary pipe. Currently, there are two types of Ruyan e-pipe devices - one is rosewood and the other is agate. Like the Ruyan e-cigarette, the Ruyan e-pipe comes with two rechargeable lithium-ion batteries and replaceable nicotine cartridges in 32 mg, 20 mg and 0 mg strengths. Cartridges deliver the same amount of vapor equivalent to the "puffs" provided by two packages of cigarettes for the average traditional smoker.

=== Ruyan E-cigar (electronic cigar) ===
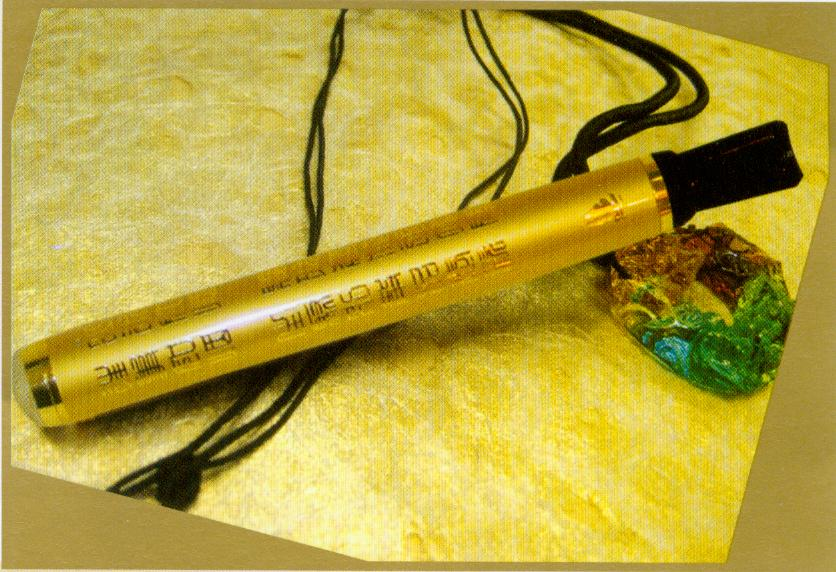
A Ruyan electronic cigar (first generation)

The first generation of Ruyan Electronic Cigars was first manufactured and launched in the Chinese market in 2004. The device itself comes in several designs. Cartridge flavors include Original, Fruit, and Menthol.

RUYAN Vegas and RUYAN e-Gar represent the second generation in Ruyan electronic cigars. They were first manufactured and launched in the Chinese market in late 2007 where the new product is referred to as RUYAN No. 1. In the Americas, the product is called RUYAN Vegas. In Europe, the Middle East, Africa and Asia/Pacific, the product is branded RUYAN e-Gar.

This new line of products has its own unique features. The new products look more like traditional cigars. They are five and one-half inches in length with a circumference of approximately a size 50 ring. Like other Ruyan e-cigarette products, RUYAN Vegas and RUYAN e-Gar produce no tar and no second-hand smoke and can be used anytime, anyplace.

RUYAN Vegas and RUYAN e-Gar are disposable products that deliver more than 1800 puffs of vapor - roughly equivalent to the number of puffs commonly consumed with a full carton of cigarettes. The products come fully charged, with a 16 mg nicotine cartridge pre-installed. They may also be easily stored and may be carried upright, mouthpiece up, in a pocket or briefcase.

RUYAN Vegas was awarded the honor as the most marketable new product at the 2008 Tobacco Plus Expo held in Las Vegas from April 23 to 25th, 2008.

== Legal disputes ==
In February 2009, Ruyan released a press release saying that they had asserted patent rights to the e-cigarette in a key Chinese court ruling and that a rival manufacturer, Cixi E-cig, had been ordered to destroy its entire inventory and cease trading. Cixi E-cig responded by denying the statement asserted by Ruyan. A Chinese court had ruled that two of their products did infringe on Ruyan's intellectual property regarding products containing piezoelectric technology, and they were required to stop producing those specific products.

In June 2012, Ruyan filed patent infringement lawsuits against six U.S. electronic cigarette manufacturers in the United States District Court for the Central District of California.
