= Hon Lik =

Chinese pharmacist

Han Li (Hon Lik)
- 韓力
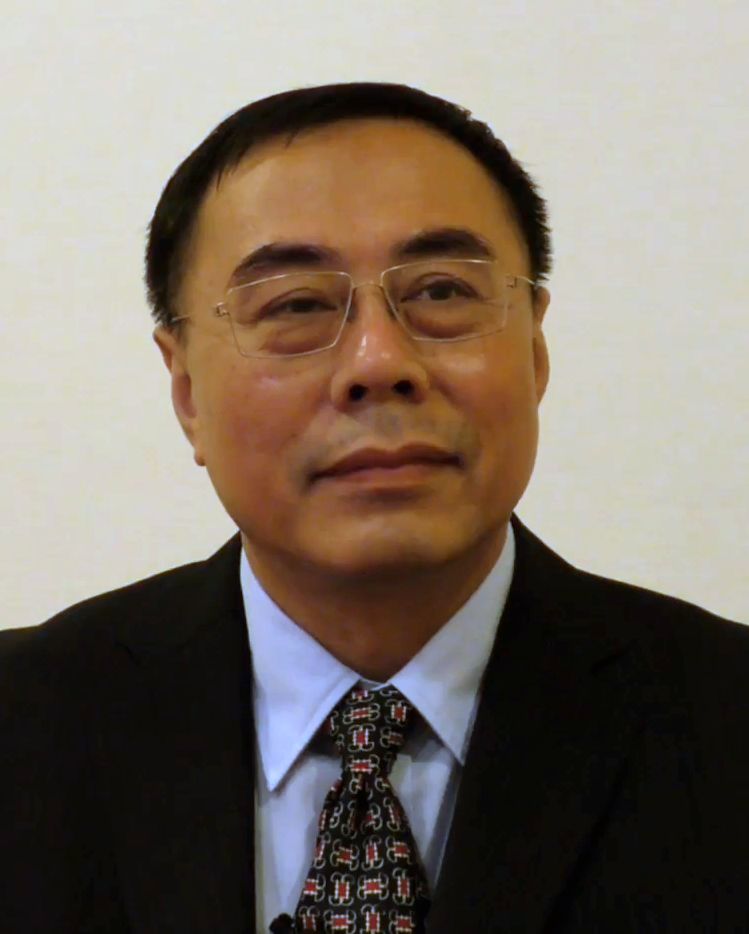
- Born: 1951 (age 74–75); Shenyang, Liaoning, China
- Known for: Inventor of the modern electronic cigarette

Han Li or Hon Lik (Chinese: 韓力; pinyin: Hán Lì; Cantonese Yale: Hon Lik) is a Chinese pharmacist who invented the modern electronic cigarette.

== Early life ==
Hon Lik (or Han Li) was born in Shenyang, China in 1951. He started smoking at age 18. He attended Liaoning University of Traditional Chinese Medicine and graduated with a pharmaceutical degree. He joined the Liaoning Academy of Traditional Chinese Medicine in 1982.

== Career ==
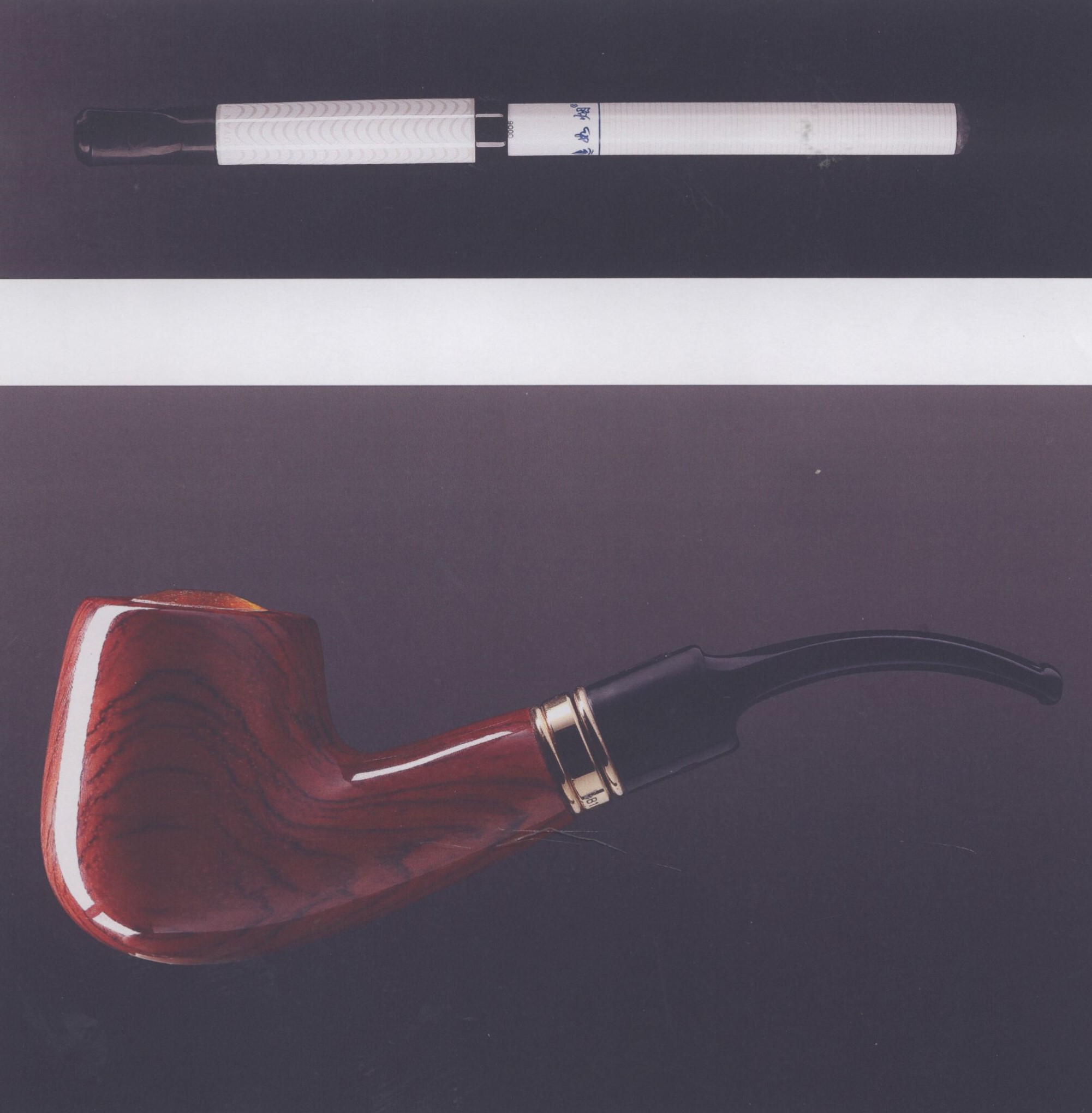
Ruyan devices

From 1990 to 1994, Hon Lik was the Deputy Director of Liaoning Academy of Traditional Chinese Medicine, in charge of research and development of new botanical drugs. In 2003, he become Director of Western Technologies Corp.

He was a co-founder of Dragonite International Limited, a Hong Kong company in health care, pharmaceuticals, and electronic cigarettes. Hon was Dragonite's Chief Executive Officer and Director for eight years.

Golden Dragon Group purchased Dragonite in 2007. Golden Dragon Group sold Hon's e-cigarette invention to Imperial Tobacco, the "tobacco giant" in Britain, in 2013.

Hon Lik has compared the e-cigarette to the digital camera, suggesting it represents a similar technological shift from analog to digital. He has expressed support for greater industry regulation, encouraging involvement from major pharmaceutical companies and stricter oversight by agencies such as the U.S. Food and Drug Administration to ensure product safety.

== Invention of the e-cigarette ==
Hon's original goal was to help himself quit smoking cigarettes. Ultimately, this did not work. He is now a dual user, both smoking and vaping, but says he's still smoking only to check flavors.

He filed patents on his invention in China, the United States and the European Union based on his 2003 priority application in China. The first electronic cigarette was manufactured in 2004 in Shenyang, China, and was called "Ruyan." The Ruyan had the same system used today: aerosolized liquid through a heating element powered by an electric battery.

He is now working on another product, the "e-hookah", to be sold in the Middle Eastern and North African markets.
