= Vaping cessation =

Process of stopping using electronic cigarettes

Vaping cessation, usually called "quitting vaping", is the process of stopping using electronic cigarettes, usually those containing nicotine. Professional assistance for quitting is similar to that given for stopping cigarette smoking; however, quitting vaping can have unique challenges; as noted by researchers at Harvard Medical School, "'vapes can deliver a much higher dose [of nicotine] much faster than traditional cigarettes." This can make vapes harder to quit than cigarettes.

According to the California Department of Public Health, many people who vape do not recognize their dependence or underestimate the difficulty of quitting. The lack of clear dosage labeling on vaping products and frequent device modification can further complicate cessation efforts. Adolescents attempting to quit vaping often face challenges like exposure to peers who vape, stress from family or school, and the appeal of new e-cigarette flavors, which can lead to relapse.

== Vaping cessation methods ==
=== Cold turkey ===
Quitting "cold turkey" refers to quitting the use of an addictive substance suddenly and without assistance. A study published in 2023 found that 78.4% of participants attempted to quit vaping using this method. The same study also found that those who did not attempt this method of quitting favored this method of cessation in the future. Another study published in 2023 found that a majority of their participants (63.7%) also favored unassisted quitting.

=== Diminishing Strength progression ===
Reducing the concentration of e-liquids consumed in a vape toward zero nicotine formulations in a steady progression can wean a user away from dependence, analogous to using substitution methods.

=== Medication ===
A study showed that a smaller percentage of participants chose to attempt vaping cessation via medication assistance. Some medications that may assist in vaping cessation include Chantix, bupropion, Nortriptyline, and Clonidine. These medications have side effects such as nausea, vomiting, headache, issues with sleeping, constipation, gas, seizures, diarrhea, changes in taste, skin rashes, blood pressure problems, and changes in behavior. Combining medicines such as Varenicline and NRT may provide more benefits and be more effective for some patients. A 2025 systematic review and meta-analysis of randomized trials found Varenicline increased vaping cessation compared with placebo across multiple abstinence outcomes and was generally well tolerated, though nausea and vivid dreams were reported more often with Varenicline. It is important to always consult a doctor.

=== Community interventions ===
Community intervention can be a useful method in assisting vaping cessation. A study reviewed 220 Android apps and 124 iOS apps that had features such as goal setting, positive feedback, and checking in with the user's baseline. Others who have attempted to quit vaping have also cited the use of online message boards or websites. These websites and message boards provide a space in which users can communicate with each other and provide support for each other, and share information about vaping cessation. In-person community intervention is also an option in the form of support groups, group therapy, or simply relying on their already established support system such as friends and family.

=== Substitutes for e-cigarettes ===
There are a few methods to substitute for the habit of vaping. Staying busy is a useful form of distraction such as riding a bike, going for a walk, chewing gum, and keeping one's hands occupied in nicotine-free environments. Some have also used non-addictive nicotine-free herbal smoking devices as a way to wean themselves off of the habit of vaping. Some may not find this method useful as it may trigger cravings or remind them of vaping. There is no conclusive evidence or literature in favor of the use of herbal smoking devices for vaping cessation.

There are online options to help users quit vaping. To address the fact that nicotine cravings can happen anywhere, designers of "serious games" have created cessation apps for phones, available for download online. In 2024, the CDC started promoting online cessation programs specifically designed for people addicted to vaping nicotine.

== Factors affecting success ==
=== Nicotine addiction ===
Possible side effects of nicotine

Vaping may cause nicotine addiction. Because of the highly addictive nature of nicotine, stopping the use of the product causes withdrawal symptoms. These symptoms include but are not confined to strong cravings, mood changes, irritability, restlessness, loss of appetite, increased appetite, and headaches. Those attempting vaping cessation may find the experience of these symptoms challenging. Nicotine is the primary addictive substance in many vaping products, but the major health harms of smoking are caused primarily by toxic chemicals produced by burning tobacco, rather than by nicotine itself.

=== Social and emotional triggers ===
Many people who vape regularly associate vaping with certain routines, environments, or social situations like hanging out with friends or taking breaks at work. Even after the physical addiction starts to fade, these habits and associations can stick around and make quitting harder.

=== Lack of support ===
Support for vaping cessation is still limited. Vaping is a relatively new trend compared to cigarette smoking, so there are not as many resources for people trying to quit e-cigarettes. A study published in the Journal of Smoking Cessation pointed out that among professionals who assist vapers in vaping cessation, there are gaps in understanding how vaping works and how to best support people who are trying to quit. These gaps in knowledge can make it harder for vapers to get the help they need.

Research shows that many adolescents and young adults who try to quit vaping are relying on informal strategies, like quitting cold turkey or using distraction techniques, rather than evidence-based tools or professional help. This highlights a disconnect between what is available and what people are actually using to try to quit.

The ease and discreeteness of vaping can get in the way of quitting. Vapes are small, easy to carry around, and simple to use without drawing attention. That kind of access can make it harder to avoid temptation, especially in places where vaping is not actively discouraged.

== Side effects ==
=== Withdrawal symptoms ===
While the strength of addiction may be stronger, the nature of withdrawal symptoms appears similar to that seen with smoking. Quitting vaping can lead to a variety of physical and psychological side effects, particularly during the early stages of cessation. These side effects are often due to nicotine withdrawal, as the body readjusts to functioning without a regular supply of the addictive substance. The severity and duration of symptoms may vary depending on the level of dependence, duration of use, and individual health factors.

==== Symptoms ====
Nicotine withdrawal is a common challenge during vaping cessation. Symptoms may begin within hours after the last use and can last several days to weeks. Common physical and cognitive withdrawal symptoms include:

- Irritability or frustration
- Increased appetite or weight gain
- Difficulty concentrating, restlessness
- Insomnia or disturbed sleep patterns
- Cravings for nicotine
- Headaches and dizziness
- Coughing or sore throat, as the respiratory system begins to recover

These symptoms are often most intense within the first 3–5 days of quitting but generally subside over time. Some individuals report that withdrawal symptoms from vaping can be more intense than from traditional cigarettes, potentially due to the higher nicotine concentrations in certain e-cigarette products.

=== Mental health ===
In addition to physical withdrawal, individuals who quit vaping may experience mental health challenges, especially if they had previously used nicotine to manage stress, anxiety, or depression. After cessation, users may initially notice:

- Heightened anxiety or mood swings
- Symptoms of depression
- Decreased ability to manage stress without nicotine
- Increased feelings of restlessness or boredom

These effects are typically temporary, but they can be significant enough to lead to relapse if individuals do not have support systems or coping strategies in place. Notably, while nicotine may temporarily relieve symptoms of anxiety or depression, long-term dependence can exacerbate these conditions, and many users report improved mental health after a sustained period of abstinence.

== Motivations ==
=== Health benefits ===
==== Physical ====
Compared to traditional smoking, nicotine vaping products are relatively new and there is limited empirical evidence regarding their long-term health effects and patterns of use. Based on preliminary research cessation of vaping can contribute to reduced physical health risks. Vaping can worsen public health when used by those who would not have otherwise start using Nicotine Vaping products or smoking or if used by those who would have otherwise quit smoking.

Evidence reviews conducted by the Office for Health Improvement and Disparities and the Royal College of Physicians have concluded that, in the short and medium term, vaping poses a minimal risk compared to smoking, although it is not entirely risk-free, particularly for individuals who have never smoked.

Certain components of e- cigarette aerosol, like formaldehyde and acrolein, have been classified as genotoxic agents that are able to cause mutagenesis and DNA damage, both of which can result in carcinogenesis. Research shows that these components, plus heavy metals and reactive aldehydes found in e-cigarette vapor, can damage epithelial cells and alter cellular repair mechanisms, which has been proven to contribute to cancer development over time.

A study in the American Journal of Preventive Medicine studied data from over 32,000 U.S. adults and found that both former and current e-cigarette users had significantly higher odds of developing respiratory diseases, like asthma, chronic bronchitis, emphysema, and COPD, compared to those who don't vape. Current e-cigarette users had 1.29 times the possibility of developing respiratory disease, while users who use both e-cigarettes and combustible tobacco have 3.30 times increased risk compared to non users of either product. This research aligns with laboratory evidence that e-cigarette aerosol can impair immune function, increase inflammation, and contribute to oxidative stress in the lungs. Animal studies show that vaping disrupts lung lipid metabolism and suppresses innate immune defenses, increasing the bodies vulnerability to infection and pulmonary damage.

A 2021 study reported that constant e-cigarette use impairs endothelial function, increases oxidative stress, and promotes vascular inflammation, all processes that can contribute to the development of cardiovascular disease. NIH studies showed that both e-cigarette use and traditional cigarette smoking impair blood vessel function, reduce flow mediated dilation, and increase vascular stiffness, indicating cardiovascular damage.

==== Mental ====
Initial research suggests that the relationship between cigarette smoking and depressive symptoms seen in adolescents and young adults may be similar with electronic cigarette use. Both the Truth Initiative and a 2023 American Heart Association study show a strong correlation between vaping and mental health challenges. A Truth Initiative Survey found that 90% of users who stopped vaping reported having lower levels of stress, anxiety and depression and 47% of users felt a greater sense of control following the cessation. A 2023 American Heart Association study with over 2,500 people aged 13–24 found that around 60% of people who vape experience anxiety symptoms, compared to 40% of non-vapers. Around a third of people who vape use these products to cope with anxiety or depression, with users who vape both nicotine and THC more likely to report addiction. Researchers say that developing better coping skills can reduce the likelihood of young people turning to vaping for issues like anxiety and depression.

== Cost ==
=== Personal burden ===
Vaping can represent a significant and ongoing financial commitment for regular users. Disposable e-cigarettes, which are popular for their convenience and ease of use, typically cost around $20 each. The cost of one use per week totals to over $1,000 a year. There is often a higher upfront cost to purchase the refillable vaping devices. The average cost is usually around $30 to $50, but ongoing expenses still add up quickly. A single bottle of e-liquid can cost around $20 to $30 and may only last a week, depending on usage. That means some users could be spending upwards of $1,500 annually just to maintain their vaping habit. These regular costs can sneak up on people over time and may become a significant financial burden, especially for young adults or lower-income individuals.

In contrast, quitting vaping can also involve expenses, but these often depend on the approach someone takes. Nicotine replacement therapies such as patches, gum, or lozenges are some of the most commonly used tools to help people stop. The cost of these therapies can vary widely depending on the product and whether it is covered by insurance. Many health insurance plans are required under the Affordable Care Act to cover tobacco cessation treatments, which can lower or eliminate out-of-pocket costs for some people. Not everyone has access to this kind of coverage, and even those who do may still have to pay for over-the-counter options or cover prescription co-pays.

While quitting vaping has apparent health and financial benefits in the long run, the cost of quitting can still be a major barrier, especially at the beginning of the process. Many people who want to stop vaping turn to nicotine replacement therapies or behavioral counseling, but those supports are not always easy to access. A two-week supply of nicotine patches, for example, can cost around $75 without insurance. For someone who needs multiple rounds of treatment or who does not have reliable insurance coverage, these costs add up quickly. Younger users or people from low-income backgrounds may not be able to afford these tools out of pocket.

Another issue is perception. Some individuals may feel that it is cheaper to keep vaping than to invest in quitting tools, especially since the costs of vaping are spread out over time and often seem less noticeable. In contrast, the price of quitting, such as buying a full month's worth of patches or paying for counseling upfront, can feel like a bigger hit financially even if it saves money in the long run. This perception, combined with inconsistent access to affordable treatment, can discourage people from making quit attempts or lead them to give up early. Making cessation tools more affordable and accessible could go a long way in supporting those who want to stop but are struggling to afford the help they need.

=== Society ===
The financial impact of vaping extends beyond the individual. On a national scale, the healthcare costs associated with e-cigarette use are surprisingly high. A study from the University of California, San Francisco, estimated that vaping costs the United States approximately $15 billion each year in medical expenses. That breaks down to more than $2,000 per vaper annually. These costs are tied to increased health complications linked to vaping, including respiratory issues, cardiovascular problems, and other chronic conditions that require medical attention. As more long-term data emerges, the full extent of vaping's impact on public health continues to grow, suggesting that these costs may rise even higher in the years ahead.

Additional research also shows that people who vape are more likely to report experiencing poor health than those who do not use any form of tobacco. This can lead to more frequent doctor visits, emergency room trips, and hospital stays. All of this puts pressure on individuals and their families, public health systems, and employers who may bear the cost of increased insurance claims and reduced productivity. For organizations and governments looking to reduce healthcare costs, addressing vaping as a long-term health risk.

== See also ==
- Smoking cessation
