= Vuse =

American electronic cigarette brand

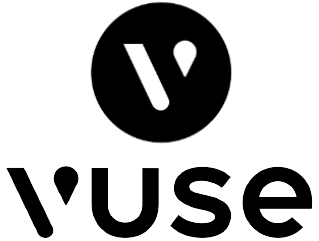
- Product type: Electronic cigarette, e-liquid
- Current owner: Reynolds American (British American Tobacco)
- Produced by: R. J. Reynolds Vapor Company (United States); Nicoventures Limited (global)
- Introduced: 2013; 13 years ago
- Related brands: Vype
- Markets: Worldwide
- Website: vuse.com

Vuse (pronunciation: V-iws) is an American brand of electronic cigarettes introduced in 2013. They are produced and marketed by the Reynolds American tobacco company and globally by its parent company, British American Tobacco (BAT). Products were previously also marketed internationally as Vype, originally launched by BAT before its acquisition of Reynolds American, until 2021.

== History and products ==
Reynolds American launched Vuse in a June 2013 press conference, the first time the company had launched a product with a press conference in two decades. R.J. Reynolds promoted Vuse with print, direct mail, and TV advertising, the latter of which is highly unusual for tobacco products in the United States. Produced and marketed by its new R.J. Reynolds Vapor Company (RJRVC) subsidiary, Vuse was launched in Colorado, but it quickly become available across the rest of the United States.

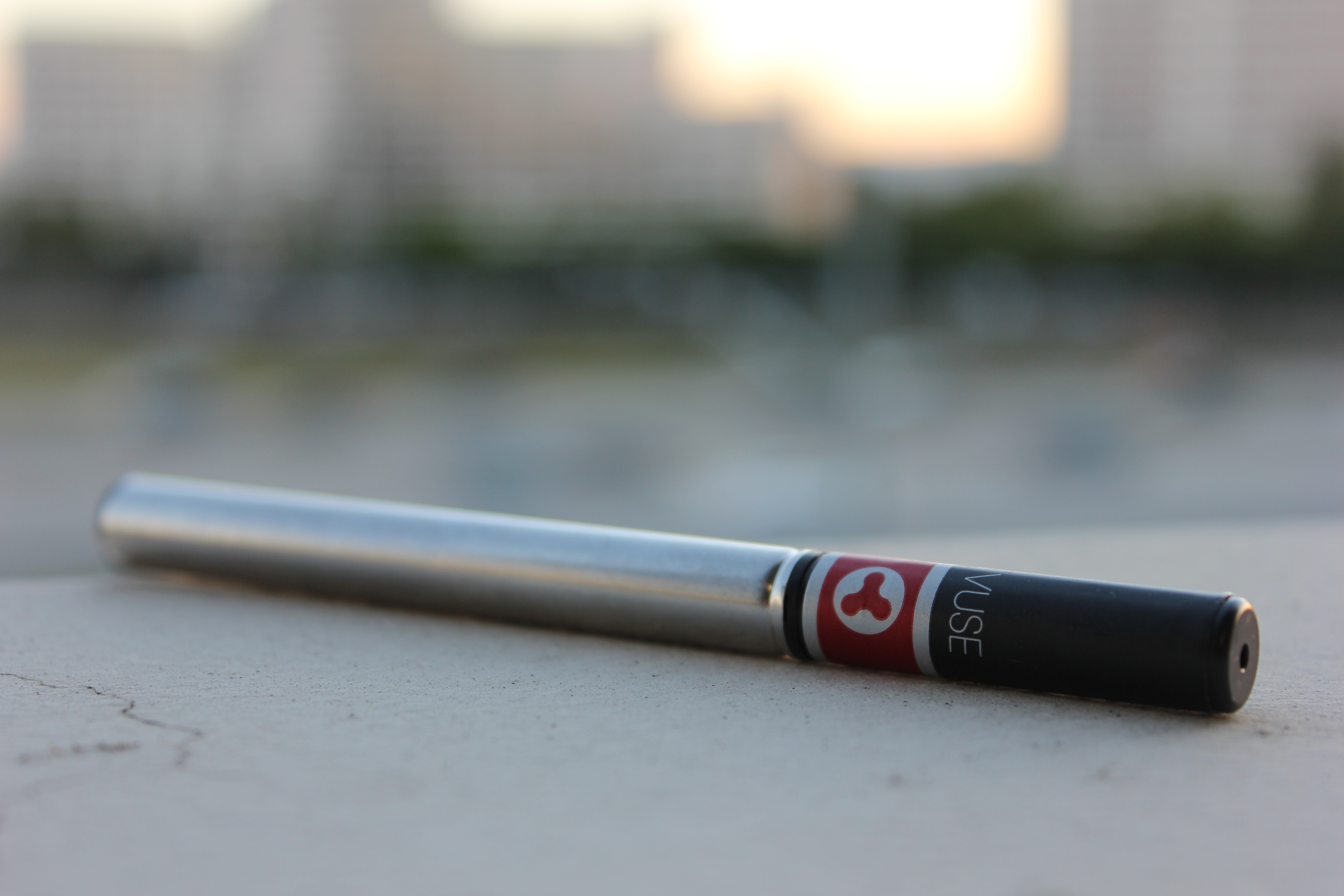
A Vuse "cigalike" e-cigarette device

In 2016, R.J. Reynolds Vapor introduced the Vuse Vibe e-cigarette, featuring more liquid and a larger battery compared to the previous Vuse Solo. In 2017, British American Tobacco (BAT) purchased Reynolds American Inc. (RAI), effectively putting the Vuse brand under the control of BAT, who were already marketing a line of e-cigarettes named Vype outside the United States. BAT and RAI were already collaborating on vapor products for over a year before the parent company acquisitions.

In August 2018, Vuse launched the Vuse Alto, (marketed as Vuse ePod in Canada) a pod mod-type vaporizer, which is the variant of e-cigarette that rival Juul is. It was marketed as a direct competitor to Juul and would become one of the best-selling devices in the market.

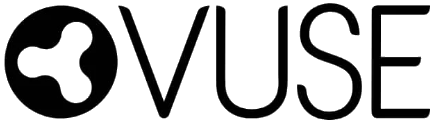
Former logo until 2021

In April 2018, R.J. Reynolds Vapor Company issued a recall of Vuse Vibe devices throughout the United States. It stated that the batteries of Vuse Vibe vaporizers were malfunctioning and overheating after injuries were reported. The cause of the malfunction has not been disclosed.

In 2023 outside the US, Vuse ePen 3 was discontionued while Vuse ePod was rebranded to Vuse Pro. The same year, BAT started marketing Vuse in South Korea beginning with the Vuse Go and Vuse also entered the Malaysian market.

=== Vype ===
In 2013, British American Tobacco (BAT) became the first of the Big Tobacco firms to launch an e-cigarette, when it released the Vype brand in the United Kingdom. The launch also oversaw the first British TV adverts by a tobacco company in two decades. The products were distributed by BAT's vapour subsidiary Nicoventures and were originally developed by CN Creative, which BAT purchased. Vype was soon rolled out and released in France, Germany and a number of other countries. Within a year, BAT launched two more e-cigarettes, Vype eStick and Vype ePen.

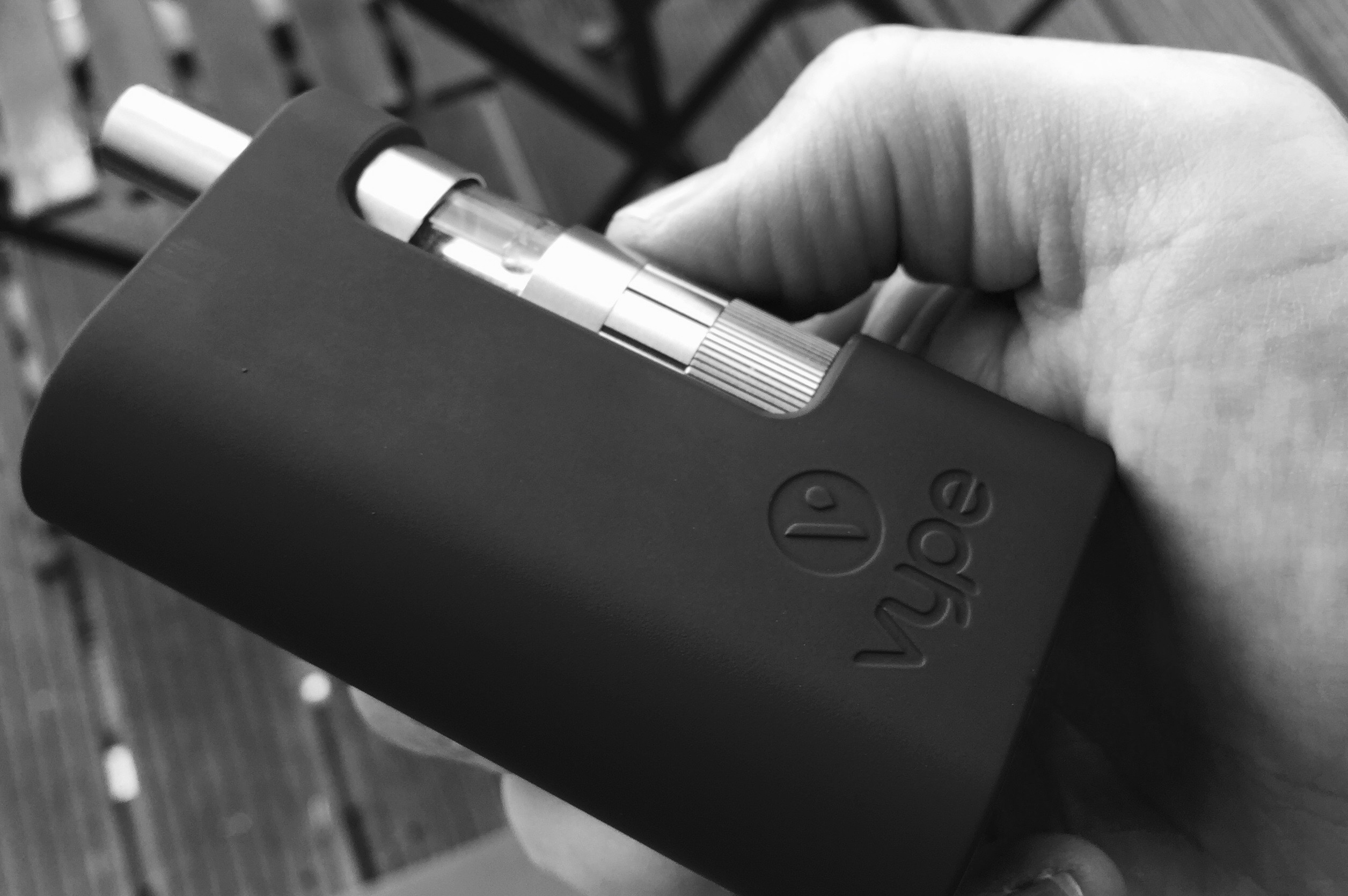
Vype eTank mod e-cigarette device

In November 2016, BAT opened its first Vype international flagship store in Milan, Italy. By this time, Vype had become the market leading brand of e-cigarettes in Europe (France, Germany, Italy, Poland and UK). In 2018, Vype ePen 3 was released which accounted for high revenues for the company in Western Europe. In 2019, BAT launched the pod-based Vype ePod, which is based on the Vuse Alto.

From April 2021, Vype products were rebranded and consolidated globally into the Vuse brand which BAT inherited from the acquisition of Reynolds American.

== Legal issues ==
In 2015, Jerod Harris filed a lawsuit against Vuse for "[failure] to inform customers of the potential health risks incurred by using the products; specifically, inhalation of the carcinogens formaldehyde and acetaldehyde," a violation of California state law.

In 2019, the US Food and Drug Administration started a review process to determine whether R.J. Reynolds Vapor Company's Vuse e-cigarette can claim that it is less risky than tobacco products. However, in 2021 researchers at Johns Hopkins University analyzed the vape aerosols of popular brands such as Juul and Vuse, and found "nearly 2,000 chemicals, the vast majority of which are unidentified."

On October 12, 2023, the FDA issued Marketing Denial Orders for six flavored Vuse Alto pods, including the Menthol pod. The Tobacco flavored Alto pod is the only flavor now allowed to be sold by R.J. Reynolds in the United States.

== Sales and popularity ==
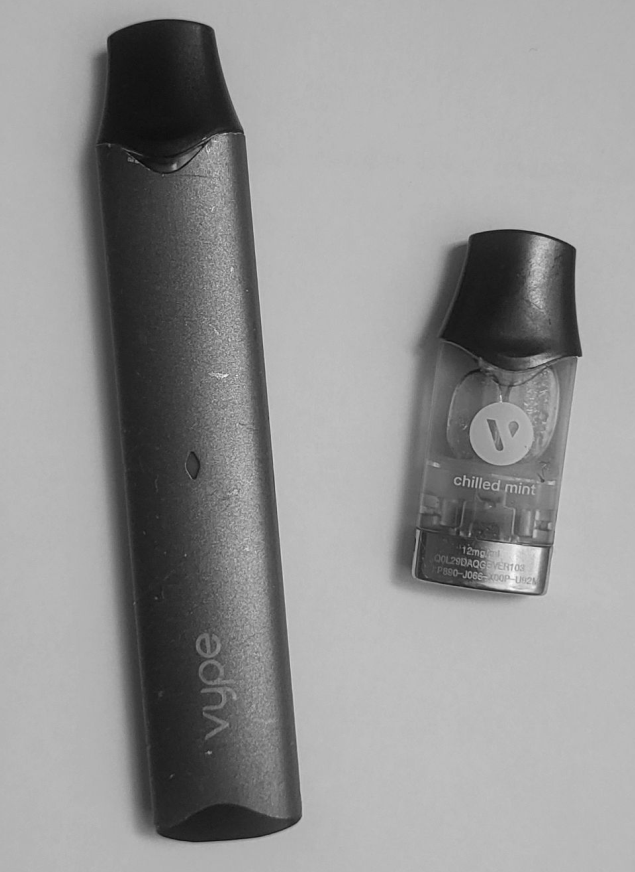
A Vype ePod with a pre-filled 12mg 'Chilled Mint' flavour e-liquid pod for use with it

In 2015, it was the most popular e-cigarette in the United States with 33% market share in Nielsen-tracked channels. However, Vuse lost its top position in 2017, when Juul overtook it to become the most popular e-cigarette in the US. As of August 2018, Vuse controlled 10% percent of the American e-cigarette market, compared to Juul's 72% market share. By September 2023, however, Vuse's market share stood at 41.5% versus Juul's 24.7% market share.

Meanwhile, the Vype brand was the most popular e-cigarette brand in numerous European countries as of 2016.

In the market for disposable e-cigarettes specifically, Vuse ranked third in the US with a share of 21% in 2023, according to figures by the Food and Drug Administration. This is one percent behind Esco Bar and far behind Elf Bar/EBCreate, which is officially not authorized by the FDA.

In September 2021, BAT reported that Vuse was the most popular e-cigarette brand in Canada, France, Germany and the UK, and that its vapor business reached 7.5 million consumers. As of 2024 the Vuse Alto is the best-selling e-cigarette in the United States.

== Motorsport sponsorship ==
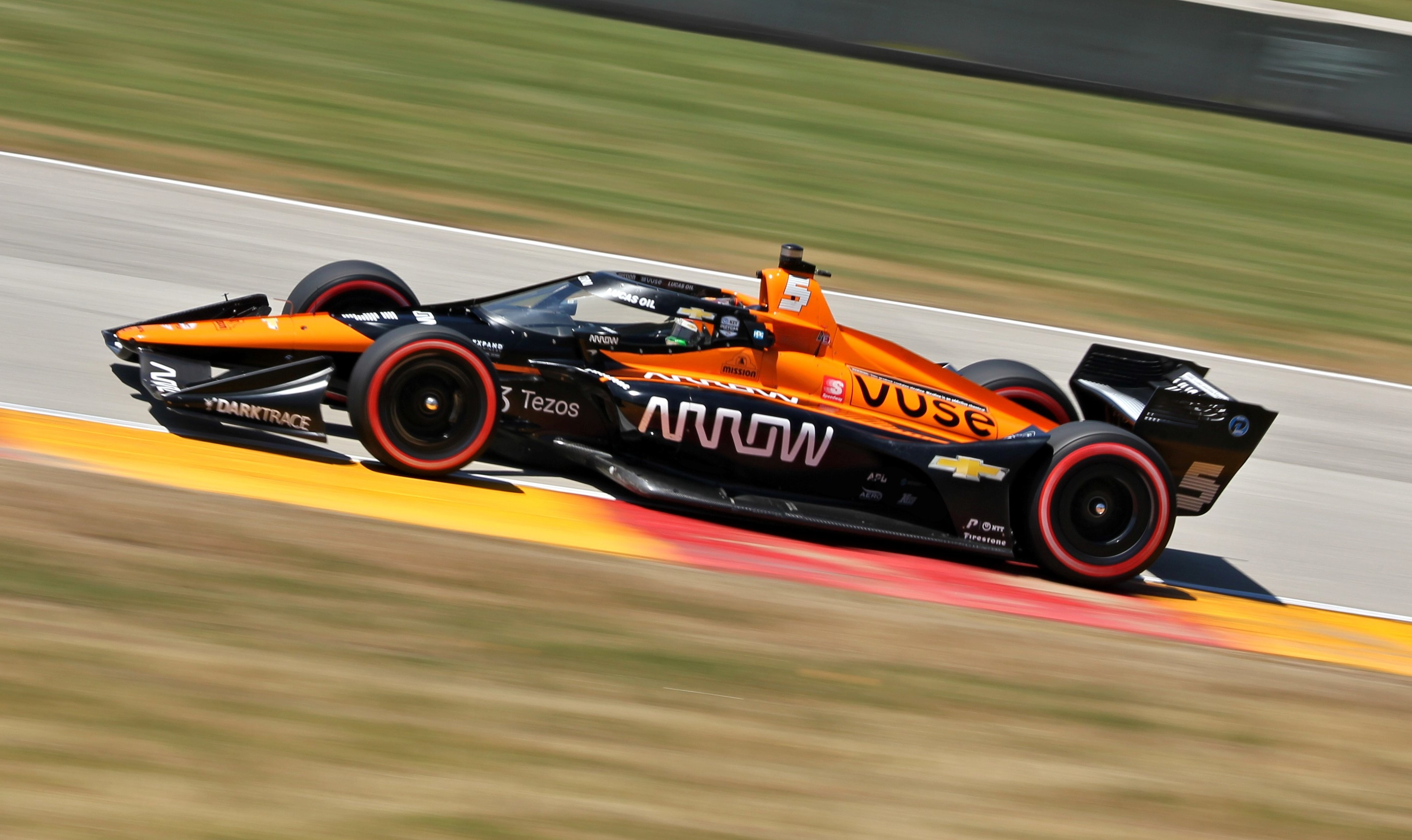
Arrow McLaren team at the 2021 IndyCar Series with Vuse livery

In 2019, British American Tobacco (BAT) signed a partnership deal with McLaren under its A Better Tomorrow campaign to promote BAT brands Vype, Vuse and Velo. The partnership was later enhanced, which includes partnering with the McLaren IndyCar Team. Vuse partnered with McLaren to race one-off liveries designed by emerging artists called Driven By Change at the 2021, 2022 and 2023 Abu Dhabi Grands Prix featuring the works of Egyptian-born, UAE-based artist Rabab Tantawy, Lebanese artist Anna Tangles and Saudi Arabian Nujood Al-Otaibi respectively.
