= Kind Consumer =

UK-based company, developer of Voke nicotine inhaler

Kind Consumer Ltd
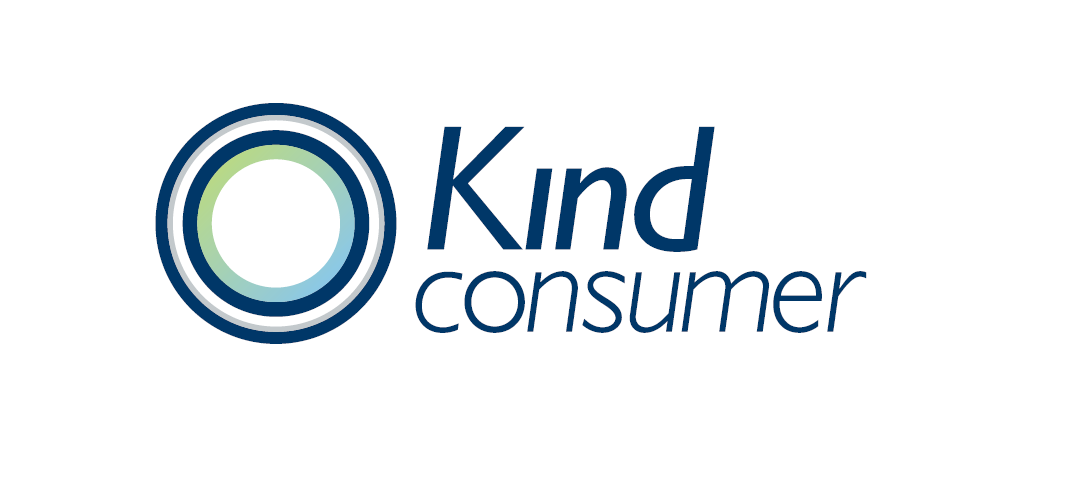
- Trade name: Kind Consumer
- Company type: Private company
- Industry: Pharmaceuticals
- Founded: London, United Kingdom 2006
- Founder: Alex Hearn
- Defunct: 9 December 2020
- Headquarters: London, England, UK
- Key people: Alan Sutherland (Chief Executive Officer); Alex Hearn (Founder); Dr Chris Moyses (Chief Medical Officer)
- Products: Voke
- Number of employees: 15
- Website: www.kindconsumer.com

Kind Consumer Limited was a UK-based company that developed Voke, a nicotine inhaler intended to address tobacco harm reduction. The company was founded in 2006 by Alex Hearn, a British inventor and entrepreneur based in London.

The company collapsed into administration in 2020, after raising £140m in funding from investors.

== Voke ==
Kind Consumer's inhaler, Voke was designed to provide the combination of a rapid delivery of nicotine and the unique respiratory tract sensory cues of inhaled nicotine which together are of primary importance in relieving craving for nicotine. The idea took 13 years to develop and was the brainchild of Alex Hearn, an asthmatic Oxford graduate whose parents smoked and who went through more than 800 prototypes before settling on a design.

The Voke Inhaler contained a micro-valve which was activated by the user inhaling, and unlike an e-cigarette, does not need electronics, batteries or heat to produce a hit of nicotine. Since it uses inhaler technology to deliver the nicotine, the Voke administers a precise dose of the drug which does not contain the tar, tobacco or other substances found in regular cigarettes.

In late 2010, Kind Consumer agreed an exclusive development and distribution agreement with Nicoventures Limited (later renamed Nicovations Limited) a wholly owned subsidiary of British American Tobacco plc.

In September 2014, Voke became the first simulated cigarette to be authorised by the UK's Medicines and Healthcare products Regulatory Agency (MHRA) as a nicotine replacement therapy (NRT). The device was seen as a competitor to both e-cigarettes and nicotine-replacement therapies, such as gum and patches.

Voke was launched in the UK on 5 November 2019. It could be prescribed as an aid to smoking cessation or reduction, or could be purchased directly from Kind Consumer.

== Funding ==
Kind Consumer attracted investment from an investment trust and a number of angel investors:

- Woodford Patient Capital Trust a large British investment trust dedicated to long term investments predominantly in the United Kingdom
- Sir Terry Leahy, former Chief Executive of Tesco plc
- Sir Peter Davis, former Chief Executive and Chairman of J Sainsbury plc
- Martin Beaumont, former Chief Executive of the Co-operative Group
- Jon Moulton, a British Venture Capitalist and founder of Better Capital
