= Philip S. Portoghese =

American medicinal chemist (born 1931)

Philip Salvatore Portoghese (born June 4, 1931) is an American medicinal chemist who has made notable contributions to the design and synthesis of ligands targeting opioid receptors. He is a Distinguished Professor of Medicinal Chemistry at the University of Minnesota, Twin Cities. He also served as the Editor-in-chief of the Journal of Medicinal Chemistry from 1972 to 2012, when the job was taken on by his departmental colleague, Gunda I. Georg, who shares the Editor-in-chief position with Shaomeng Wang at the University of Michigan.

== Biography ==
Portoghese was born on June 4, 1931, in Brooklyn, New York. He received a B.S. in pharmacy at Columbia University and then went on to obtain an M.S. degree in physical pharmacy in 1958. He continued his graduate studies at the University of Wisconsin–Madison and obtained a Ph.D. in pharmaceutical chemistry under the mentorship of Edward E. Smissman in 1961. He joined the faculty of the Department of Medicinal Chemistry at University of Minnesota in 1961, where he has served with distinction for over five decades. He is known internationally for designing several opioid ligands including β-funaltrexamine, naltrindole, norbinaltorphimine, and naltriben. He has pioneered the use of bivalent ligands to target opioid receptor complexes called heteromers. He was honored in 2011 for 50 years of exemplary academic service by the University of Minnesota. In 2007, he was inducted into the Hall of Fame of the American Chemical Society (ACS) Division of Medicinal Chemistry. Portoghese served as Editor-in-chief of the Journal of Medicinal Chemistry from 1972 to 2012, making him one of the longest standing editors of an ACS journal.

== Awards ==
Portoghese has been a recipient of numerous awards including:

- 1980 A.Ph.A./Academy of Pharmaceutical Sciences Research Achievement Award in Medicinal Chemistry
- 1984 American Association of Colleges of Pharmacy Ernest H. Volweiler Award for Outstanding Contributions to Research in the Pharmaceutical Sciences
- 1986 University of Catania honorary doctorate
- 1990 Division of Medicinal Chemistry, American Chemistry Society: Medicinal Chemistry Award
- 1990 Am. Assoc. of Pharmaceutical Scientists: Research Achievement Award in Medicinal Chemistry
- 1991 College on Problems of Drug Dependence, NAS-NRC: N.B. Eddy Award for Excellence in Drug Abuse Research
- 1991 Division of Medicinal Chemistry, Am. Chem. Soc.: E.E. Smissman-Bristol-Myers-Squibb Award
- 1992 Royal Danish School of Pharmacy, Copenhagen: Honorary Doctorate
- 1996 University of Wisconsin: Citation of Merit
- 1997-2006 National Institutes of Health: MERIT (Method to Extend Research In Time) Award
- 1999 Rho Chi Pharmacy Honor Society Award
- 1999 The Oak & the Tulip Medal, Società Chimica Italiana, and the European Federation for Medicinal Chemistry
- 2000 American Chemical Society: Alfred Burger Award in Medicinal Chemistry
- 2000 University of Minnesota: Distinguished Professor
- 2000 University of Minnesota: Citation of Excellence in Teaching, Research, and Service
- 2001 University of Minnesota: Weaver Medal, University of Minnesota, College of Pharmacy
- 2003 University of Minnesota: Academy for Excellence in Health Research, Academic Health Center
- 2006 European Federation of Medicinal Chemistry: Nauta Award in Pharmacochemistry
- 2007 Member, Medicinal Chemistry Hall of Fame, Div. of Medicinal Chemistry, Am. Chem. Society
- 2010 -American Chemical Society established the P.S. Portoghese Lecture, presented annually by the A.C.S. Division of Medicinal Chemistry
- 2015 -American Pharmaceutical Association, Academy of Pharmaceutical Sciences, Takeru Higuchi Research Prize
