= Foundation for a Smoke-Free World =

Non-profit organization for smoking harm reduction

Global Action to End Smoking (formerly Foundation for a Smoke-Free World)
- Nickname: FSFW
- Established: 18 October 2017; 9 years ago
- Type: Nonprofit
- Legal status: 501(c)(3) organization
- Location: New York City, United States
- Region served: Worldwide
- Fields: Tobacco industry
- Key people: Cliff Douglas (CEO and president); Heidi Goldstein (COO and CLO)
- Funding: Philip Morris International
- Website: globalactiontoendsmoking.org www.smokefreeworld.org

The Foundation for a Smoke-Free World is an organization focused on smoking harm reduction founded in 2017. In May 2024, it changed its name to Global Action to End Smoking.

It is funded by the tobacco industry giant Philip Morris International (PMI), which initially planned to provide $80 million in annual funding. The pledge agreement from PMI to the Foundation, modified in September 2020, promised $35 million in funding to the Foundation from 2022 through 2029. In 2023, the agreement was terminated, with a payment of $140 million.

The World Health Organization (WHO) urged not to collaborate with this front organization of the tobacco industry. Stanford University School of Medicine's extensive research has also exposed PMI's claims to move away from cigarettes and become 'smoke-free' as propaganda.

== History ==
=== Foundation for a Smoke-Free World ===
In its first year, the Foundation spent more on public relations than on scientific research, but had not yet spent most of its yearly budget. Its president was Derek Yach, a former World Health Organization (and later PepsiCo) executive.

An investigation conducted by investigative journalists of Le Monde, The Investigative Desk (Netherlands), Follow the Money (Netherlands) and Knack, published in April 2021, suggested that the Foundation for a Smoke-Free World is a lobbying tool used by Philip Morris International to circumvent the WHO Framework Convention on Tobacco Control. According to internal documents from 2014, PMI's strategy consisted of dividing the tobacco control movement (schematically divided between "prohibitionists" and "pragmatists") and bending the WHO in order to promote alternative products (e-cigarettes, heated tobacco, etc.) to cigarettes.

The Center of Excellence for the Acceleration of Harm Reduction (CoEHAR) at the University of Catania is funded by the Foundation (through an intermediate company named ECLAT SRL) and some of its researchers (such as Riccardo Polosa) published tobacco-related papers without declaring funds received from the Foundation nor conflicts of interest. Advocacy groups directly or indirectly funded by the Foundation have stated that vaping with electronic cigarettes is a safer choice than smoking cigarettes, regarding the health effects of COVID-19.

On 28 September 2022, the second edition of the Tobacco Transformation Index (an initiative of FSFW) was released at the Global Tobacco & Nicotine Forum (GTNF) detailing the results of research into the efforts made by the world’s 15 largest tobacco companies to reduce the harm caused by the consumption of their products. The 2022 Index noted that high-risk products made up about 95% of retail sales in 2021, with so-called reduced-risk products making up the remainder. It also noted that tobacco companies are failing to invest in harm reduction in low and middle-income countries, with sales of reduced-risk products concentrated in markets with a high disposable income.

On 4 October 2022, it was reported that the Agricultural Transformation Initiative (ATI), a subsidiary of FSFW, supported Malawi-based scholars through the ATI Fellowship and Scholarship Fund. Fifteen postgraduate students shared information about their studies while speaking with experts and students at the North Carolina State University’s College of Agriculture and Life Sciences International Programs. The goal of the event was to use what the students learned to help diversify Malawi’s tobacco-reliant agricultural ecosystem.

On 31 January 2023, The Australian reported that research conducted by FSFW was published in Nicotine & Tobacco Research, appearing in a paper about patterns of tobacco use over the pandemic. The original paper was cited in further papers, causing the research to eventually be cited in more than 6,700 papers.

=== Global Action to End Smoking ===
In October 2023, Cliff Douglas became the CEO and president of the organization. In May 2024, the foundation changed its name to 'Global Action to End Smoking'.

== Criticism ==
The creation of the Foundation for a Smoke-Free World was met with skepticism by the medical community. The World Health Organization, Union for International Cancer Control, the American Cancer Society, Vital Strategies and other health organisations announced that they would not work with the Foundation, and encouraged governments and the public health community to follow their lead.

On 13 September 2017, tobacco company Philip Morris International (PMI) announced its support for the establishment of a new entity – the Foundation for a Smoke-Free World. [...] The UN General Assembly has recognized a “fundamental conflict of interest between the tobacco industry and public health.” [...] Strengthening implementation of the WHO FCTC for all tobacco products remains the most effective approach to tobacco control. [...] If PMI were truly committed to a smoke-free world, the company would support these policies. Instead, PMI opposes them. [...] When it comes to the Foundation for a Smoke-Free World, there are a number of clear conflicts of interest involved with a tobacco company funding a purported health foundation, particularly if it promotes sale of tobacco and other products found in that company’s brand portfolio. WHO will not partner with the Foundation. Governments should not partner with the Foundation and the public health community should follow this lead.

— World Health Organization, WHO Statement on Philip Morris funded Foundation for a Smoke-Free World

The independence of the Foundation for a Smoke-Free World has been challenged. The Foundation has been criticized by the Campaign for Tobacco-Free Kids, Action on Smoking and Health (ASH), Corporate Accountability International and others for taking funding from Philip Morris International.

WHO maintains its firm position that it will not partner with this organization and strongly recommends that governments and the public health community do the same. Our concerns remain: Global Action to End Smoking operates using funds from Philip Morris International. Its activities support a broader tobacco industry strategy to mislead the public about the dangers of tobacco and nicotine product use. WHO is particularly concerned about potential efforts to target children and young people, creating a new generation of tobacco and nicotine users.

— World Health Organization, Alert on Philip Morris-funded Foundation name change to Global Action to End Smoking

== See also ==
- Conflicts of interest in academic publishing
- Health effects of tobacco
- Tobacco industry
- Tobacco lobby
  - Advancement of Sound Science Center
  - Center for Indoor Air Research
  - Tobacco Institute
