= Flazalone =

NSAID and cocaine addiction agent

Clinical data
- Other names: Flumefenine, R-760.

Identifiers
- IUPAC name: (4-fluorophenyl)-[4-(4-fluorophenyl)-4-hydroxy-1-methylpiperidin-3-yl]methanone
- CAS Number: 21221-18-1
- PubChem CID: 36663
- ChemSpider: 33682
- UNII: 5A1Y43ML91
- KEGG: D04189
- ChEMBL: ChEMBL120951
- CompTox Dashboard (EPA): DTXSID9046283

Chemical and physical data
- Formula: C_{19}H_{19}F_{2}NO_{2}
- Molar mass: 331.363 g·mol^{−1}
- 3D model (JSmol): Interactive image
- SMILES: CN1CCC(C(C1)C(=O)C2=CC=C(C=C2)F)(C3=CC=C(C=C3)F)O
- InChI: InChI=1S/C19H19F2NO2/c1-22-11-10-19(24,14-4-8-16(21)9-5-14)17(12-22)18(23)13-2-6-15(20)7-3-13/h2-9,17,24H,10-12H2,1H3; Key:PPQZABOURJVKNI-UHFFFAOYSA-N

Flazalone is an anti-inflammatory drug that has not been approved as a medicine.

== Further Analogues ==
According to Shaomeng Wang and co-workers, replacement of the para-fluoro halogen with a meta, para-dichloro substitution arrangement resulted in dopamine reuptake inhibitors useful in treating cocaine addiction. Whereas Diclazalone achieved a Ki of 10.9nM for the mazindol binding site (DAT), flazalone only achieved 5700nM for the same receptor (even weaker than for the phenindamine precursor which was 4420nM). However, the para-methyl compound was the one titled in the article publications. This had a Ki of 492nM for the mazindol binding site (DAT), which is more promising than flazalone if we are only talking about this receptor. For comparison consider WIN 35,428 versus RTI-32.

Diclazalone (Flazalone analog)

== Synthesis ==
The synthesis has been covered: Patents: Alternate synthesis: 62%:

N.B. The p-fluoroacetophenone [403-42-9] has dual use in the synthesis of Enecadin [259525-01-4].

== See also ==
- Phenindamine
