= Vail v. Juul Labs, Inc. =

United States wrongful death lawsuit

- Court: United States District Court for the Northern District of California
- Full case name: Lisa Vail v Juul Labs, Inc.
- Citations: N.D. Cal., No. 3:19-cv-06597

Court membership
- Judge sitting: William Orrick III

Keywords
- personal injury, product liability, wrongful death claim

Vail v. Juul Labs, Inc., is a wrongful death lawsuit brought by Daniel David Wakefield's mother, Lisa Vail, on October 15, 2019 against Juul Labs. According to the complaint, Juul caused the death of the 18-year-old via its marketing tactics. The wrongful death lawsuit has been filed by San Francisco–based firm Levin Simes Abrams which has previously litigated in cases concerning e-cigarette battery explosions. The case has been filed as a personal injury/product liability claim in the United States District Court for the Northern District of California. The case has been assigned to William Orrick III.

== Case background and media response ==
"The suggestion that only black market vape products are connected to vape-related deaths and illness is entirely inaccurate, if you ask two lawyers representing the mother of 18-year-old David Wakefield who suffered from asthma and died while fighting a two-year addiction to Juul Labs Inc.'s nicotine e-cigarettes," Alexis Keenan, a Yahoo! Finance reporter, stated on October 15, 2019. "[The case] is going to be a shouting match, as lawyers say, between experts, between the plaintiff's physicians and psychiatrists and the defendant's physicians and psychiatrists as to whether or not Juul actually caused or precipitated the death," judicial analyst judge Andrew Napolitano said on October 16, 2019. This is the first wrongful death vaping lawsuit.

The 18-year-old died in his sleep on August 31, 2018 purportedly as a result of breathing difficulties after years of Juul use. On the night he died, he was not showing any signs of breathing problems, according to his mother. He was a healthy teenager until he started using Juul at 15, to the complaint. In under a year of Juul use, the teenager had terrible mood swings and his efforts in school dropped, according to the complaint. His family contends that Juul Labs capitalized on the lack of e-cigarette regulations and marketed its product to appeal to youth. The teenager was enticed, the complaint contends, to Juul's "candy-like flavors, sleek and discreet design, and its representations that it was a healthier alternative to combustible cigarettes."
