= Electronic cigarette and e-cigarette liquid marketing =

Electronic cigarette marketing targets a diverse audience through various media, promoting claims related to safety, health, and lifestyle through multiple media. This marketing has expanded and evolved significantly since the early 2000s, displaying parallels to strategies from the mid-20th century. E-cigarettes are marketed to smokers and non-smokers, including men, women, and youth, typically as a safer alternative to traditional cigarettes. Starting In the 2010s, tobacco companies increased their efforts. Marketing frequently features pseudoscientific health claims, despite evidence that e-cigarette aerosol contains harmful substances. Products are also promoted as a means to bypass smoke-free policies, marketed with slogans such as "smoke anywhere". US law mandates health warnings on e-cigarette packaging and advertisements: "WARNING: This product contains nicotine. Nicotine is an addictive chemical."

Celebrity endorsements, product placements in films, talk shows, and music videos, and sponsorships of sports events (e.g., American football, motor racing, golf) are common promotional tools. Vape shops predominantly rely on social media for marketing, with tactics that may glamorize smoking and appeal to youth and non-smokers, even if unintentionally. Advertising emphasizing health and lifestyle themes can encourage non-smoking youth to try e-cigarettes, potentially offsetting concerns about nicotine addiction. Increased marketing correlates with rising vaping rates among youth and young adults.

E-liquid packaging and labeling often mimic child-friendly products like juice boxes or candy, raising concerns about child safety. Unlike traditional cigarettes, e-cigarettes in the US and many countries face fewer marketing restrictions, allowing advertising on television and online. Claims of efficacy as smoking cessation aids appear in ads across the US, UK, and China, though such assertions lack regulatory approval.

== Background ==
Tobacco was long used by various indigenous groups that lived in the Americas. The Columbian exchange introduced tobacco to the Europeans, and it became an addictive, lucrative and heavily traded commodity. Following the Industrial Revolution, cigarettes became hugely popular worldwide. In the mid-20th century, medical research demonstrated severe negative health effects of tobacco smoking such as lung cancer, which led to governments adopting policies to force a sharp decline in tobacco use.

Smoking is the primary cause of premature death in the US. E-cigarettes and other nicotine delivery systems (e.g., nicotine gum) were introduced in response to the health concerns and associated usage restrictions surrounding smoking. Makers claimed that these products were less harmful to users and bystanders and helped users to reduce their nicotine addiction over time. The nicotine, flavors, and additives that make up the e-cigarette aerosol have their own health impacts, although deemed safe by makers. All these claims have since been examined in hundreds of studies.

E-liquids can be flavorless, or have added flavors, such as mint chocolate truffle, whiskey, bubble gum, gummy bears, strawberry mint, pink punch, and cotton candy. This product differentiation is one means of broadening the market.

Most developed countries set age limits for e-cigarettes, ranging from 18 to 21 years. Countries such as Brazil and India ban e-cigarette sales entirely.

=== Philip Morris International ===
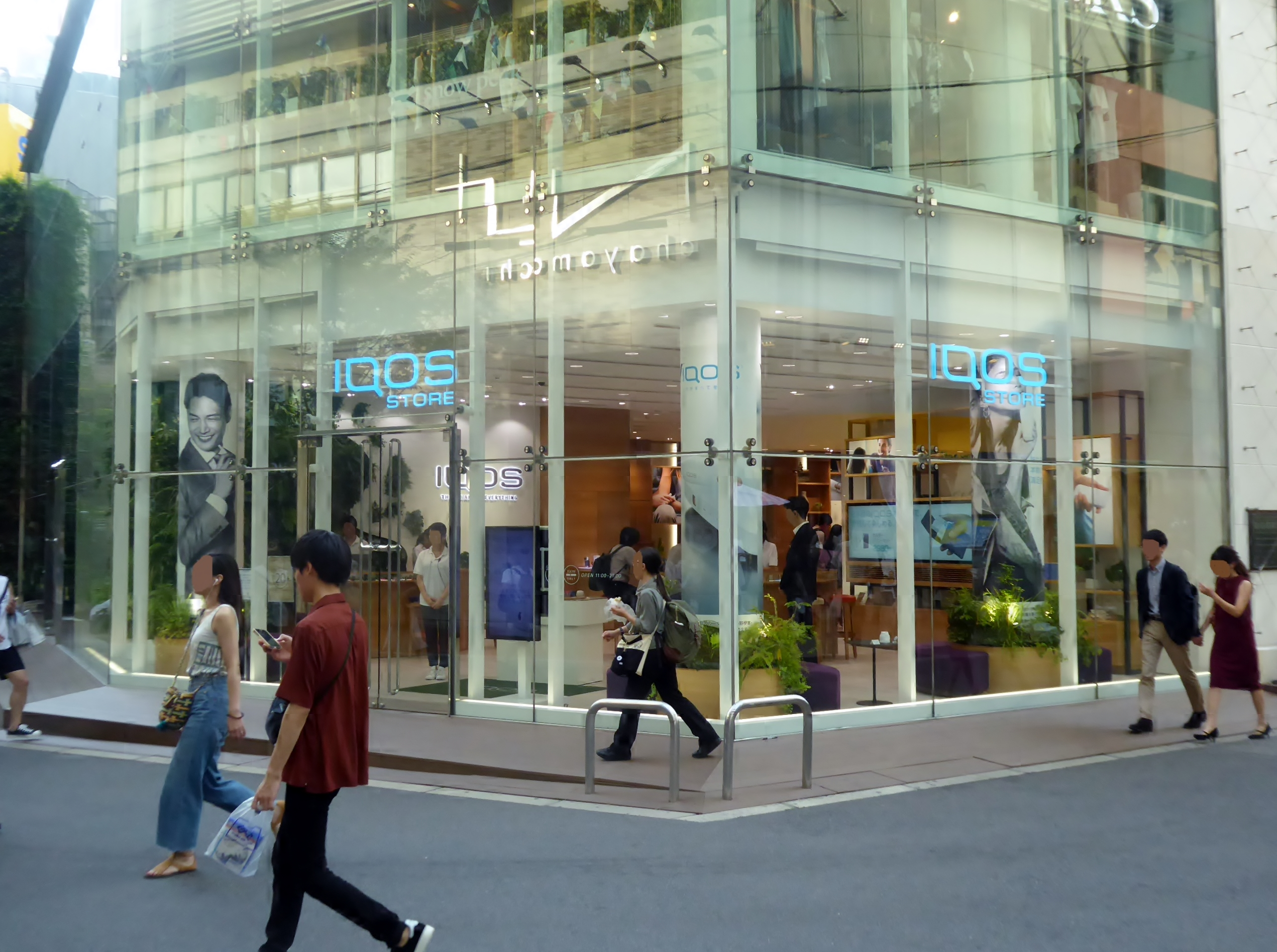
Exterior view of IQOS store in Japan. IQOS is a heated tobacco product of Philip Morris International.

As a component of a public relations scheme, one of the tobacco industry's approaches is to finance scientific research. For example, Philip Morris International created and financed the Foundation for a Smoke-Free World. The organization states that it will assist with the idea of "ending smoking in this generation by eliminating the use of cigarettes and other forms of combustible tobacco." In 2017, Philip Morris International stated that it will donate $960 million over a 12-year period to the organization. $80 million each year is approximately 0.1% of Philip Morris International's sales and below 1% of its earnings. However, Philip Morris International allocates billions on various types of promotion and lobbying for the tobacco industry. The organization cannot be considered independent from Philip Morris International, as of September 2018. "Absent true independence achieved through structurally separating the funding, priorities and management of the Foundation from the existing prearrangement that clearly benefits Yach and PMI, the Foundation for a Smoke-Free World may function operationally to advance and amplify tobacco industry messaging and potentially exacerbate conflicts within public health," according to the journal Tobacco Control in 2018.

Philip Morris International states that the Foundation for a Smoke-Free World intent is to advance the end of smoking, but tobacco control advocates are skeptical, stating that the company continues to market traditional cigarettes that they know are not safe. By promoting the continuation of nicotine addiction with the use of vapes and heated tobacco products, by the tobacco industry still making money from the selling of these products, the Foundation for a Smoke-Free World is merely "a platform for its sponsor's latest products". In 2020, advocacy groups that are indirectly funded by Philip Morris International through the Foundation for a Smoke-Free World are putting out information that contradicts public health officials that are stating that the effect from the use of e-cigarettes is unknown as well as their potential for causing harm. The Global State of Tobacco Harm Reduction (GSTHR) dismissed the relationship between e-cigarette use and making individuals more susceptible to infection from COVID-19. "Such spin can take a dangerous toll, not just on public health but now on the global economy as well," stated Michél Legendre, a campaign manager at the not-for-profit Corporate Accountability International.

Philip Morris International anticipates a future without traditional cigarettes, but campaigners and industry analysts call into question the probability of traditional cigarettes being dissolved, by either e-cigarettes or other products like IQOS. Outside of an IQOS store in Canada, marketing included a display sign on the pavement with the message, 'Building a Smoke-Free Future'. Philip Morris International has opened IQOS stores in Japan and other places around the world. the emissions of Philip Morris International's IQOS product produce both aerosol and smoke. In 2012, Phillip Morris International researchers stated that this product produces smoke. Phillip Morris International made the decision in 2016 that the IQOS product does not produce smoke. In 2017, a commentary published in JAMA Internal Medicine was written by a Swiss scientist. That angered Phillip Morris International because it stated that the IQOS product generated smoke.

External videos
- Death In The West (Full-length Documentary)

Death in the West is a 1976 anti-smoking documentary film. Reporter Peter Taylor got Helmut Wakeham, then vice president of Philip Morris USA's science and technology, to acknowledge that there are carcinogens found in regular cigarettes. Wakeham stated: "There are all kinds of things that are unhealthy...what are we to do, stop living?" Wakeham also stated, "The average doctor is a layman with respect to intimate knowledge of smoking and health." When Taylor pushed him again about the carcinogens, he responded, "Anything can be considered harmful. Apple sauce is harmful if you get too much of it." Taylor interviewed American cowboy Bob Julian next to a campfire. Julian stated: "I started smoking when I was a kid following these broncobusters." He added, "I thought that to be a man you had to have a cigarette in your mouth. It took me years to discover that all I got out of it was lung cancer. I'm going to die a young man." Julian died just a few months after being interviewed.

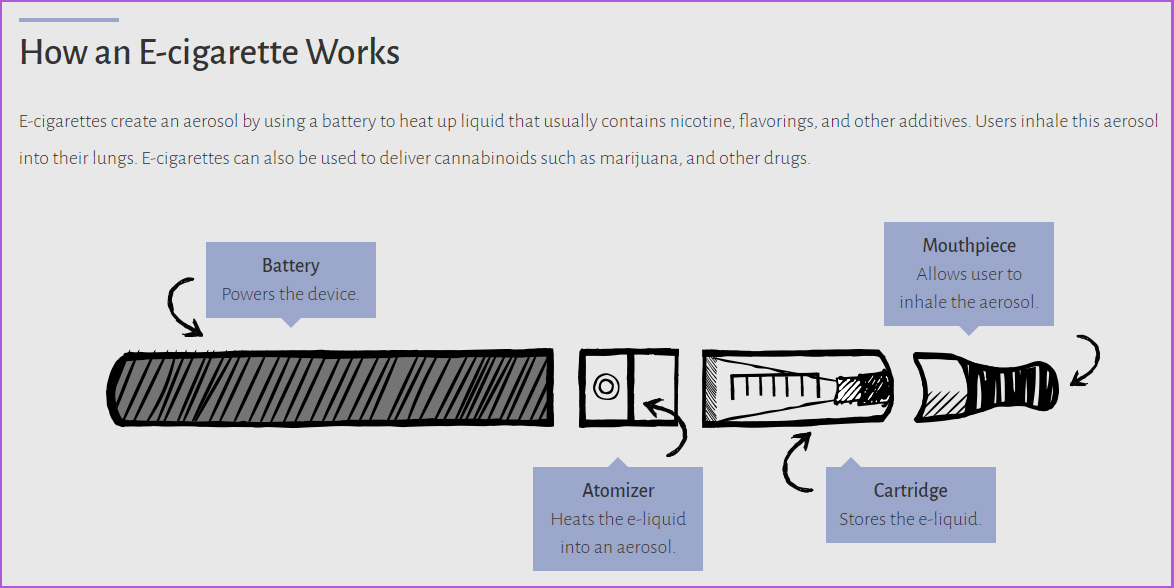
Graphic from the 2019 US Surgeon General's report entitled How an E-cigarette works

== Branding ==
Brand marketing is particularly important for commodity products such as e-cigarettes, because the products are similar. Branding helps differentiate such products. Leading e-cigarette makers are partially or wholly owned by tobacco companies. Promoting e-cigarettes allows tobacco companies to rebrand themselves as helping to end smoking.

Television and radio advertising of tobacco have been prohibited in the US since 1971, with more restrictions added in 2019. These regulations, however, do not cover e-cigarettes.

E-cigarette companies' promotional tactics include television advertisements; point of sale advertisements, social media; Influencers, search engine advertising, web sites for individual products and those that focus on music, entertainment, and sports; and sponsorships and free samples. The use of social media seems to be the primary promotional channel. For example, Juul's successful campaign concentrated on social media. Many of these channels are closed to traditional cigarettes.

Meanwhile, e-cigarette advertising reaches youth. In 2016, 78.2% of middle and high school students – 20.5 million youth – were exposed to e-cigarette advertisements. Ad exposure increases intention to use e-cigarettes among adolescent non-users, and is associated with current e-cigarette use, in a dose-dependent fashion: increasing exposure is associated with increased odds of use. However, youth smoking has reached record lows in the US.

E-cigarettes are promoted as a smoking cessation device, a smoking alternative, and as a recreational activity whereby the user can create personal vaping experiences with the use of flavors, device modification, and vape tricks.

== History ==
As of 2019 transnational tobacco companies dominated the market, including British American Tobacco, Imperial Brands, the Altria Group, Reynolds American, Philip Morris International, and Japan Tobacco International.

== Expenditure ==
In contrast to cigarette and smokeless tobacco businesses, e-cigarette businesses are not mandated to provide their marketing and promotional spending to the US Federal Trade Commission, therefore, the total amount they spend is uncertain, as of 2018. E-cigarette businesses have largely expanded their marketing spending. As of 2017, e-cigarette advertisement spending across every media channel is rising every year. As of 2016, the majority of the large tobacco businesses owned at least one e-cigarette brand and these products are quickly becoming a substantial part of the total advertising spending. As of 2017, all the large tobacco businesses were offering e-cigarettes.

US e-cigarette marketing expenditures increased from $3.6 million in 2010 to $125 million in 2014, which translated into rapid increases in youth e-cigarette use. Between January 1, 2008, and June 30, 2012, 131 different brands were advertised. The majority were e-cigarette brands along with a few retailer brands such as Vaporium. In 2013, blu accounted for more than 60% of spending followed by Njoy, Fin, Mistic, and 21st Century Smoke. Six large e-cigarette businesses in the US spent $59.3 million on promoting e-cigarettes in 2013.

E-Lites, Vype, SKYCIG, NJOY, and Gamucci e-cigarette businesses spent approximately £8.4 million in the UK in 2013. British American Tobacco spent £3.6 million in the UK in marketing its Vype product in 2014.

Between 2015 and 2017, Juul spent $2.1 million in marketing efforts.

Manufacturers noticed the fast rise in consumer interest in e-cigarettes, so they quickly pushed to expand the sale of their products to brick-and-mortar retail stores.Sales of cigalikes and related products were first observed in Nielsen's store-scanner database in 2007, and between 2009 and 2012, retail sales of e-cigarettes expanded to all major markets in the US.

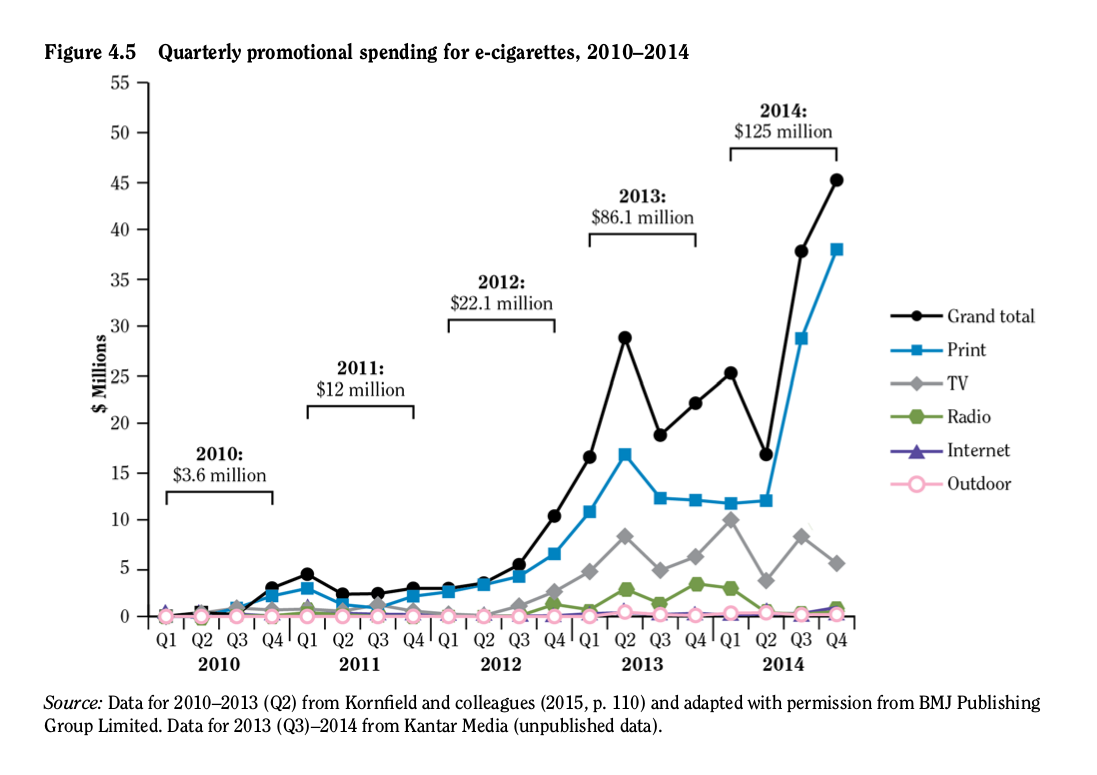
Quarterly promotional spending for e-cigarettes, 2010–2014

== Media ==
E-cigarette advertisements are found in all forms of media, including television and radio where traditional cigarette advertisements were banned more than 40 years ago. Some e-cigarette advertisements from about the last two years leading up to 2013 looked very similar to tobacco advertisements appearing in the 1960s, 1950s, and 1930s.

E-cigarette advertisements are on television, radio, magazines, newspapers, online, and in retail stores. Early on, e-cigarettes were mainly advertised online. From 2011 to 2013, e-cigarette television ad frequency rose 256%. Between 2010 and 2014, e-cigarettes were second only to traditional cigarettes as the top advertised product in magazines. The three most common media were print, television, and e-mail, and spending was highest for print advertisements, as of 2014.

=== Social media ===
The manufacturers of these products have established a massive online presence, many apparently from individual users (self-styled as 'vapers') whose enthusiasm for these products is such that they seem to spend many hours each day blogging and tweeting their benefits free from the constraints that would be imposed if they were producing official advertisements. More worryingly, they also engage in grossly offensive online attacks on anyone who has the temerity to suggest that ENDS are anything other than an innovation that can save thousands of lives with no risks.

— Postgraduate Medical Journal

E-cigarettes are heavily promoted across all media outlets.

E-cigarette businesses promote their e-cigarette products on Facebook, Instagram, YouTube, Twitter, and Online blogs and forums offer user-created promotional content. and Groupon.

==== X/Twitter ====
E-cigarettes are marketed across multiple feeds, offering discounts, "kid-friendly" flavors, algorithmically generated false testimonials, and free samples. Some business accounts promote vaping as an aid to quitting smoking. Promotional videos provide information on how to use such products.

==== YouTube ====
Vendors such as Eonsmoke paid YouTubers to review their products on YouTube. Most videos associated with vaping portray it as a safe and cool replacement to smoking. E-cigarette businesses have advertised online on Google Search, Yahoo! Search, and Bing.

==== Influencers ====
Juul paid Instagram influencers to publicize their products and offered thousands of free samples at launch parties. Attendees were encouraged to post selfies on social media. After a 2010 law was revised to include e-cigarettes, Juul started asking people to pay a $1.00 for the device.

In August 2017, a Twitter advertisement for Juul's "creme brulee" pods asked people to retweet if they savored the "dessert without the spoon". In May 2018, Juul's Twitter account had no age restrictions.

Juul announced in June 2018 a new social media approach that ended its use of models on social media. instead featuring former smokers who switched to Juul.

A Facebook page had the message: "V-Shisha sunshine promo!! Save 20% ... off our 5-pack of 0% nicotine, fruity and sparkly disposables."

E-cigarettes have been marketed on Facebook even though its policy does not allow that, and in a many cases, age restrictions were not implemented. A 2018 study reported that less than 50% of the nicotine-related pages they visited restricted youth access. Fruit flavored e-liquids are the most commonly marketed on social media.

Product appeal and marketing terms used for online e-cigarette advertisement.
Product name	Marketing terms	Product appearance
E-Njoint	Natural, harmless, safe, cartoon young woman	Bright colors
Juul	Stylish, intensely satisfying, intelligent design, elegant, innovative, young people	Bright colors, design
ExcluCig	Exclusive, luxurious, fashionable, high quality, young woman	—^{a}
Treasurer vape	Elegant, discrete, pure, high quality, high-end product	White, light grey, flowers, design
Vaporcade Jupiter	Technology, discrete, quality, young woman	Black, design
Innokin lily	Elegant, luxurious, exclusive, beautiful vaping, young woman, highest quality, design	Swarovski crystals, flower, colors
Zensations	Unique, like real cigarette, variation of tastes	Design
Cig-a-LinQ	A Dutch brand, next generation, developed by smokers	Stylish

^{a}Information not available.

=== Online ===
E-cigarette brands use websites for direct-to-consumer marketing (e.g., direct mail and direct e-mail). Vapestick designed a PC game dubbed Electronic cigarette wars. E-cigarette ads appeared in My Dog My Style, an iPad game designed for children. The company blamed an error by its ad agency. Flavor plays a significant role for the marketing of e-cigarettes online, which encourages users to communicate with one another, in addition to providing a positive experience to the user.

=== Sponsorship ===
==== Events ====
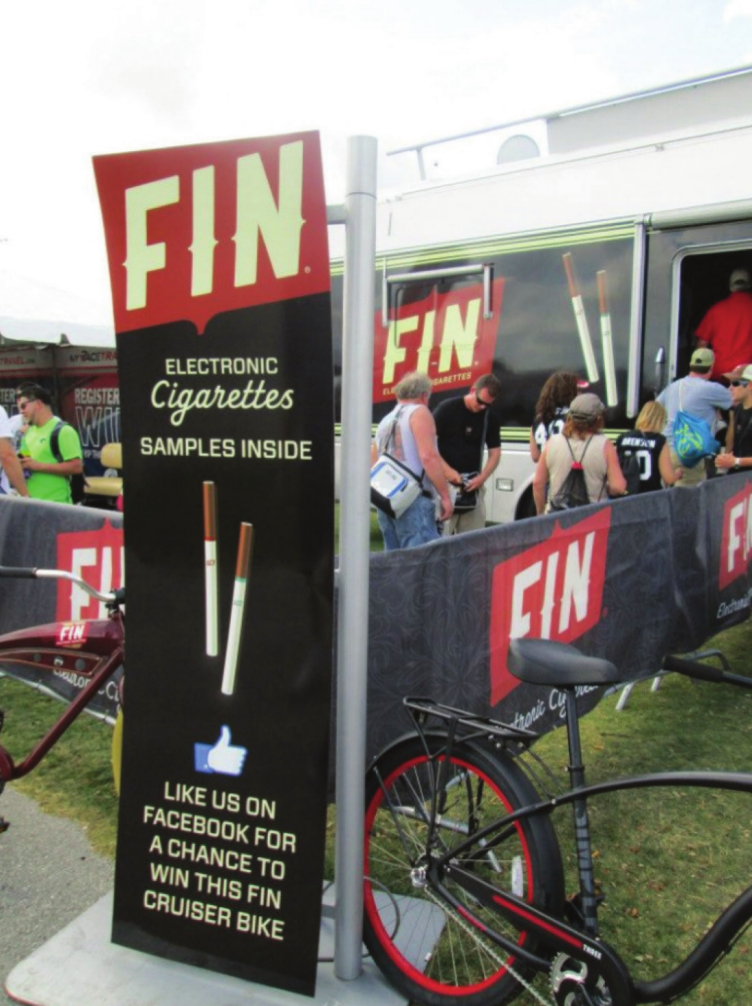
An e-cigarette sponsorship of an event

Sporting events such as football, motor racing, golf, powerboat, and superbike racing are used to promote e-cigarettes.

Initially, e-cigarettes were exempted from the sponsorship ban that expelled tobacco makers. R. J. Reynolds sponsored the 2014 Kool Jazz Festival. Other venues included bars, concerts, and music festivals. In 2012 and 2013, free samples were provided by six e-cigarette businesses at an estimated 348 events.

==== Research ====
Research funded by industry participants produced many studies.

In 2010, Arbi Group Srl from Italy, who is a vaping distributor in Europe, sponsored a large amount of research by a group at the University of Catania in Sicily, who organized and carried out a randomized trial, which was cited in a 2015 Cochrane review. The group was coordinating 9 of the 48 e-cigarette trials registered with the National Institutes of Health, as of 2015. Professor Riccardo Polosa, who constructed the trial, stated, "we were stuck accepting money from e-cigarette owners because there was no other way to carry out research."

In 2019, a review in the Translational Lung Cancer Research journal stated:

The industry continues to fund pro-vaping opinion, for example, 'moderate' doctors misreporting evidence, reaffirming their 'divide and conquer' strategy again in 2014, lobbying groups, sham supportive campaigns and front groups coordinated by tobacco companies particularly in economically wealthy countries with falling cigarette consumption, whilst at the same time continuing to aggressively market cigarettes in Africa and Asia.

Research paid for by the tobacco industry continued as of 2019. Danish doctor Charlotta Pisinger, who worked at quit-smoking clinics, stated in 2015 that a third of vaping studies had a conflict of interest because they were paid for by vaping businesses, pharmaceutical businesses and/or tobacco businesses. A 2019 review concluded that 95.1% of research without and 39.4% of conflicted research concluded that vaping was potentially harmful, while 7.7% of research associated with the tobacco industry reported that they are potentially harmful.

=== Free trials ===
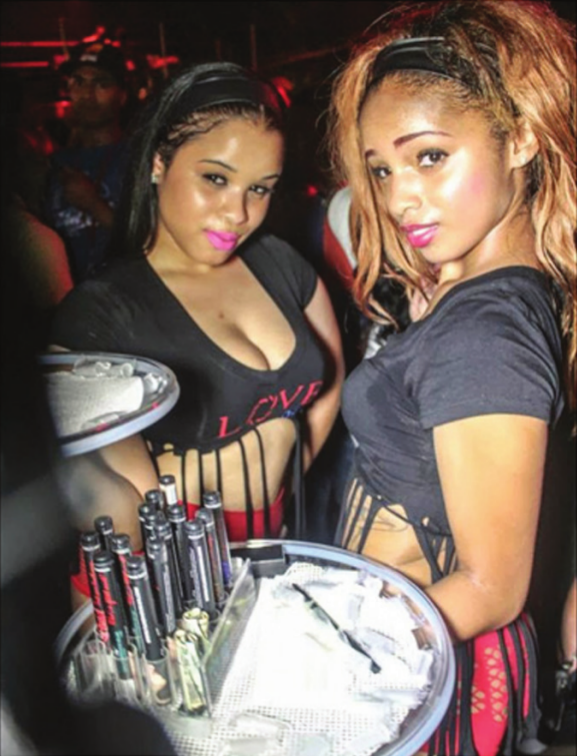
E-cigarette samples provided at an event

E-cigarette businesses have offered consumers a free 14-day trial for e-cigarette products. The "free trials" for e-cigarette products are offered online.

As of 2019 Juul was sponsoring sampling events in large US cities.

Under the US FDA Deeming Rule published in May 2016 (under litigation in 2016), free samples were banned.

=== Billboards ===
Juul offered a Times Square billboard and a spread in Vice magazine.

In 2018 Juul announced that it would no longer include models in its promotions.

== Claims ==
Claims made in e-cigarette advertising have been used in the past by traditional cigarette brands (such as having fewer carcinogens, lower risk of tobacco-related disease) or by smokeless tobacco products (such as the ability to use them where smoking is prohibited). However, under the 2016 deeming rule, e-cigarette manufacturers cannot make modified risk claims (although this provision has been challenged in lawsuits).

Some marketing associates e-cigarettes with an independent existence and freedom of choice. Other approaches feature endorsements by physicians.

Marketing attempts also associate the products with themes such as good taste, romance, sexuality, and sociability and that they can be used in smoke-free environments. E-cigarette companies do not use the word cigarette in advertisements because of its stigma.

E-cigarettes were offered as prizes in magazine competitions.

E-cigarettes have been promoted as socially appropriate or ethically better than cigarettes.

In New York City in 2016, neon signs were used to advertise the most recent flavors.

Some makers package e-cigarettes to look like a traditional cigarette pack. Marketing approaches employed by e-cigarette businesses include giving free samples. Gamucci set up a 323-square foot designated vaping area in 2013 in a departure room of Terminal 4 at Heathrow Airport to allow people to vape and sample Gamucci's products.

=== Nutrition ===
VitaminVape, VapeFully, VitaStik, and NutroVape offer nicotine-free vape products that provide vitamins and other nutrients. NutroVape states that its product provides "nutritional supplements," while VitaminVape suggests that the effects of vaping Vitamin B_{12} is like getting an injection of Vitamin B_{12}.

=== Environmental concerns ===
Some e-cigarette businesses that use cartridges state their products are 'eco-friendly' or 'green', despite the absence of any supporting studies.

=== Safety ===
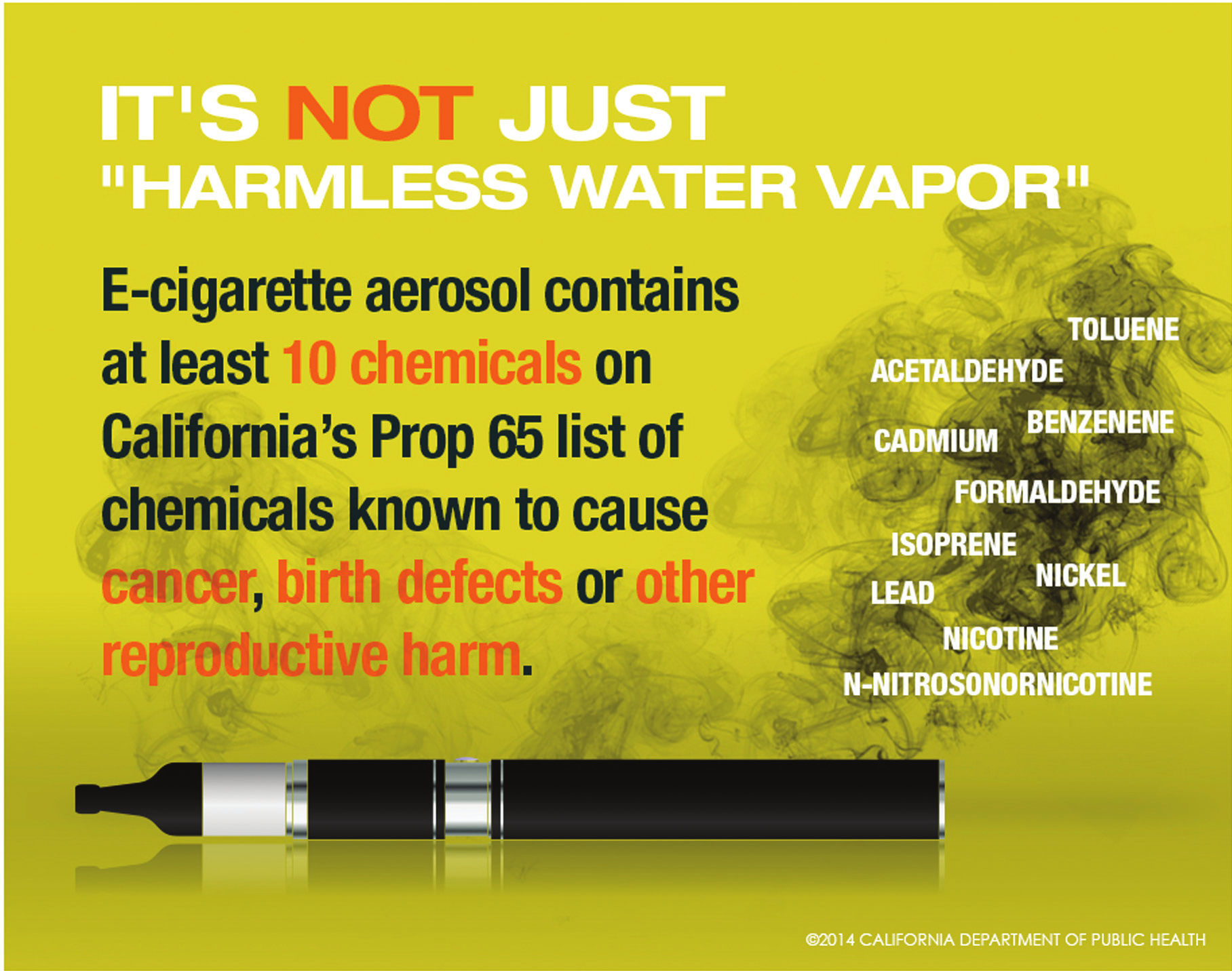
Graphic from the January 2015 California Department of Public Health's State Health Officer's Report on E-Cigarettes warning about harmful substances in e-cigarette vapor

E-cigarettes are widely marketed as safer than traditional cigarettes in the US, UK, and Europe.

In the 2010-2015 period, some makers claimed that e-cigarette aerosol was just water vapour.

E-cigarette companies have advertised that aerosol substances including glycerin are "FDA approved" or "generally recognized as safe (GRAS)", although GRAS is applicable only to food ingredients rather inhaled substances.

Some makers present e-cigarettes as medical nicotine products related to pharmaceuticalization. s A 2017 review concluded that evidence of long-term vaping safety had not been collected. E-cigarette safety claims are backed by little scientific evidence, and as products evolve, may require ongoing analysis.

A 2018 review stated, "multiple adverse effects including pneumonia, wheezing and coughing" have been associated with vaping, existing lung disease such as asthma. E-cigarettes contain potentially hazardous substances.

Makers promoted that their aerosols contain only water, nicotine, glycerin, propylene glycol, and flavoring, although a 2015 study reported heavy metals in the vapor, including chromium, nickel, tin, silver, cadmium, mercury, aluminum, while another 2015 study reported carbonyls, metals, volatile organic compounds and particulate matter, and a 2016 review concluded that e-liquids added formaldehyde (an International Agency for Research on Cancer (IARC) group 1 carcinogen), acetaldehyde (IARC group 2B carcinogen), lead, acetone, copper, and cadmium. Other studies reported that the levels of such substances were far lower than in cigarette smoke, although higher-powered vaping produces them in greater amounts.

Makers have appropriated words and images identified with healthy foods,

The manner in which e-cigarettes are marketed greatly influence the beliefs of the users regarding their harms and benefits and making choices to use such products. Many cigarette smokers have turned to vaping because e-cigarette vendors have previously marketed their product as a cheaper and safer smokeless alternative to traditional cigarettes, and a possible smoking cessation tool. The US FDA rejected these claims, and in September 2010 they informed the President of the Electronic Cigarette Association that warning letters had been issued to five distributors of e-cigarettes for "violations of good manufacturing practices, making unsubstantiated drug claims, and using the devices as delivery mechanisms for active pharmaceutical ingredients." The marketing of such products as being safer than traditional cigarettes has resulted in a rise in their use in pregnant woman.

=== Reduced harm to bystanders ===
Makers assert that vaping presents little risk to bystanders. However, "disadvantages and side effects have been reported in many articles, and the unfavorable effects of its secondhand vapor have been demonstrated in many studies." E-cigarettes are marketed as "free of primary and second-hand smoke risk" since carbon monoxide and tar are not present. Marketing leads non-vapers to perceive vaping as safe, despite the lack of data on passive vapour.

E-cigarette packages and advertisements require health warnings under US law, stating "WARNING: This product contains nicotine. Nicotine is an addictive chemical."

=== Addictiveness ===
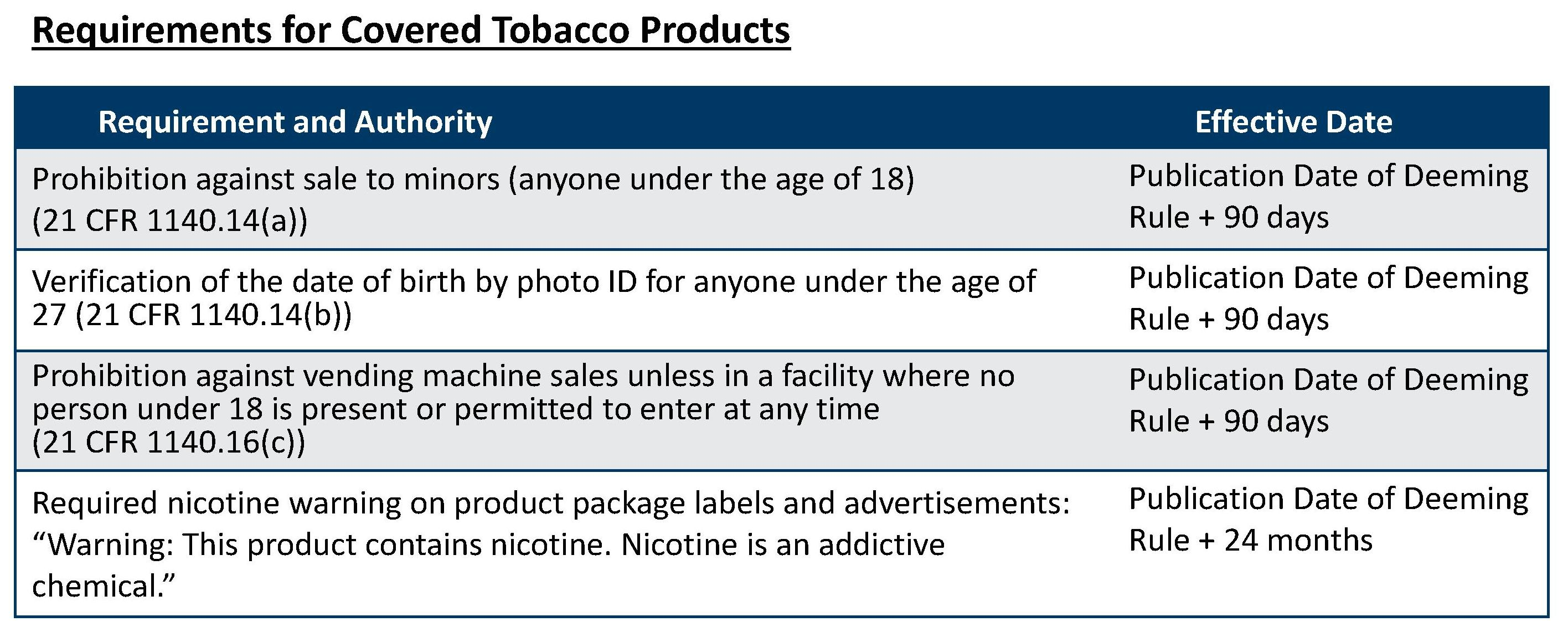
FDA regulations require, among other things, a nicotine warning for advertisements, stating "WARNING: This product contains nicotine. Nicotine is an addictive chemical."

Makers directed marketing efforts at smokers, discussing the addictive substance nicotine, claiming that vaped nicotine is safe. One tactic used to imply product safety is labeling the nicotine-containing e-liquid as "e-juice" and emphasizing its candy and fruit flavors. The fact that e-cigarettes contain nicotine is downplayed in e-cigarette advertising. Younger adults and youth who are experimenting with these products may not realize that e-juice contains the highly addictive chemical nicotine, and that the products are classified as a tobacco product. A 2014 review stated, "Children are targeted for addiction with the addition of flavorants including the addition of strawberry and chocolate to mask the otherwise bitter taste of the product." E-cigarettes are marketed with various amounts of nicotine, and the amounts of this substance absorbed is still not clear.

Some public health researchers claim that tobacco companies use e-cigarette marketing to create future tobacco consumers, as well as creating a new income stream although smoking has continued to decline since e-cigarettes came on the market. Others claim that e-cigarettes are not a tobacco marketing ploy, and that laws banning ENDS products instead protect smoking.

=== Unrestricted smoking ===
Screenshot of an unsolicited e-mail for an e-cigarette starter kit

A 2018 review stated, "E-cigarettes were initially advertised as a form of tobacco that could circumvent existing smoke-free legislation. Their increasing popularity brought initial confusion as to whether existing smoke-free legislation also applies to e-cigarettes." Some smokers were claimed to believe that such products made smoking acceptable, although smoking continued to decline.

E-cigarette marketing messages promoted "the freedom to enjoy the personal pleasures associated with smoking in places where conventional smoking has been banned". One maker highlighted this point by naming its device Lite-Up Anywhere."

A 2015 survey of American adults found that increased frequency of exposure to e-cigarette advertising was associated with lower support for policies that restrict use in public places.

These claims lost salience, since as of October 1, 2018, 789 US municipalities, 12 states, and two territories prohibited vaping in 100% smoke-free environments.

=== Smoking cessation ===
E-cigarettes are routinely marketed as a better alternative to traditional cigarettes, helping smokers to quit, costing less, leaving no smoke, ash or butts behind.

The promotion of ENDS [electronic nicotine delivery systems] comes with at least one of the following messages or a combination of them:

- try to quit smoking and if everything fails use ENDS as the last resort;
- you do not need to quit nicotine addiction, just smoking; and
- you do not need to quit smoking, use ENDS where you cannot smoke.

Some of these messages are difficult to harmonize with the core tobacco-control message and others are simply incompatible.

— World Health Organization

Vaping has long been advertised as a quitting smoking tool. Makers also claim that vaping may be used without ending smoking. E-cigarettes are also promoted as alternatives to other nicotine replacement products.

A 2019 review concluded, "Vaping has been promoted as a beneficial smoking cessation tool and an alternative nicotine delivery device that contains no combustion by-products. However, nicotine is highly addictive, and the increased use of nicotine-containing e-cigarettes among teens and individuals who are not in need of smoking cessation may lead to overall greater nicotine dependence in the population." A 2019 review found these "devices have rapidly become the most common tobacco products used by youth, driven in large part by marketing....There is substantial evidence that adolescent e-cigarette use leads to use of combustible tobacco products." However, youth smoking (and smoking overall) continued to decline along with the growth of vaping.

The FDA has not approved any e-cigarette as a quitting smoking tool.

Makers used indirect claims about quitting smoking via consumer testimonials.

Limited supporting evidence supports the marketing assertion that vaping assists smokers to limit smoking. Studies in 2017 reported that the e-cigarettes did not result in completely abstaining from smoking.

Many makers have claimed that vaping helps quit smoking. However, a 2014 review concluded that vaping to stop smoking was not supported by the available scientific evidence.

Laboratory exposure to vaping was associated with increased urge to smoke among smokers and an urge to vape among vapers. A 2019 study reported that much smaller proportions of e-cigarette advertisements now endorse vaping as a quit aid, and that reasons for use by vapers have significantly shifted away from smoking cessation towards image enhancement.

=== Cost ===
E-cigarettes are also marketed as a less costly smoking substitute. In addition, makers offer starter kits are offered at a lower price for new buyers.

==== Price promotions ====
Price promotions are offered at brick-and-mortar stores, online stores, and through social media. A 2014 report found that 80% of vaping website offered a sale or discount, while another 2014 report found that 34% of commercial tweets mentioned the words "price" or "discount." In a 2016 study of online retailers, 28% offered a promotion, such as a discount, other free items, or a loyalty program.

A substantial portion of e-cigarette marketing on social media includes price promotions, discounts, coupons, free trials, giveaways, and competitions. Incentives can persuade potential consumers to make a purchase and assist vendors to create a loyal customer base. Smokers react to changes in cigarette prices. Similarly, studies have reported that e-cigarette sales are price sensitive. Such promotions could encourage smokers to experiment with vaping as an alternative.

=== Endorsements ===
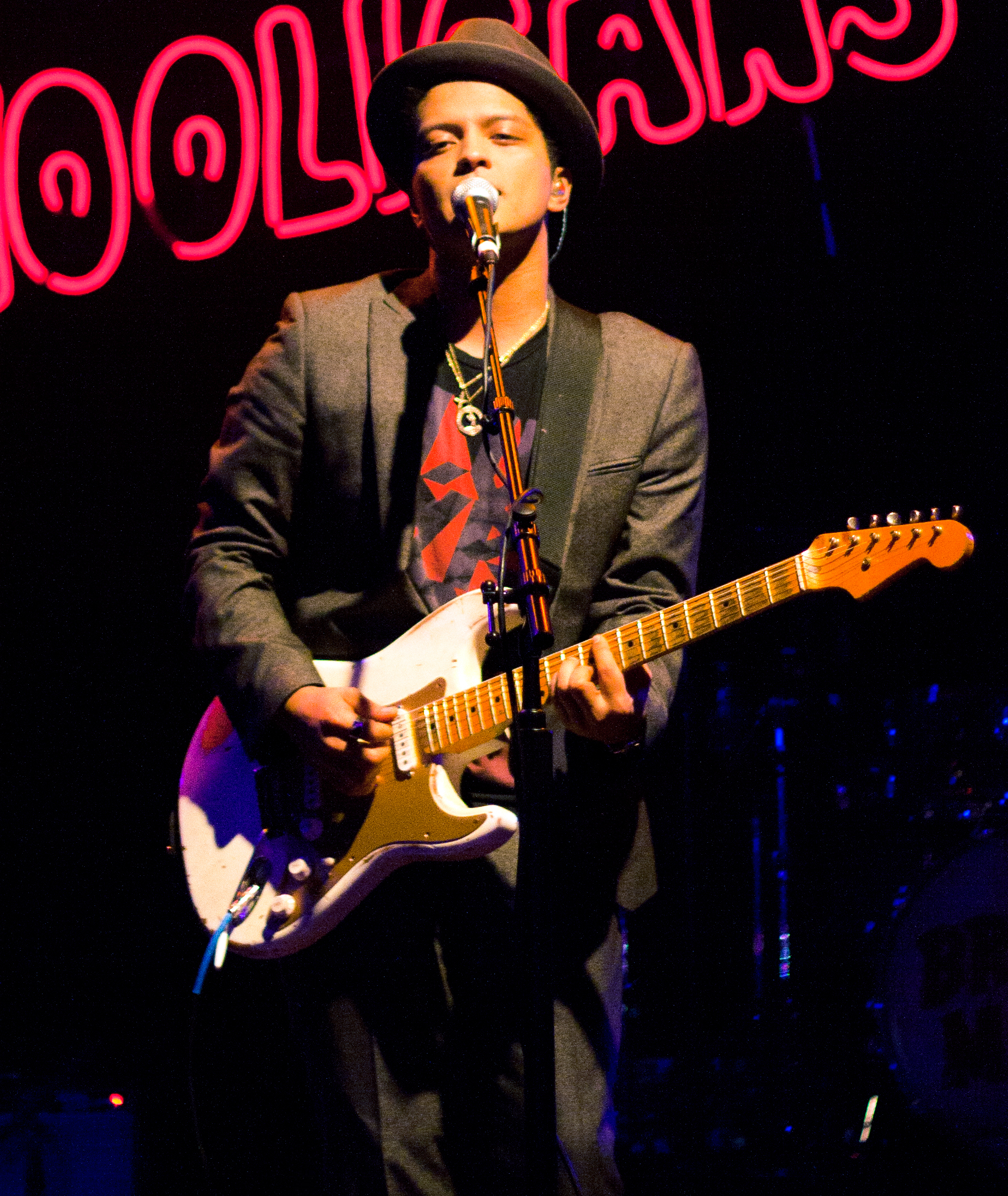
Music icon Bruno Mars endorsed NJOY e-cigarettes in 2013.

Endorsements are commonly used to encourage e-cigarette use. Celebrities began endorsing e-cigarettes no later than 2009. Bruno Mars invested in NJOY and endorsed the product in 2013. On May 12, 2013, he posted on Twitter a photograph of himself using the NJOY product. Musician Courtney Love appeared in a NJOY e-cigarette television advertisement in 2013. Actress Jenny McCarthy endorsed blu e-cigarettes in 2014.

E-cigarette marketing penetrated Hollywood, with products showing up in movies, talk shows, and in the goodie bags provided to the nominees of the 84th Academy Awards and to guests at the 52nd Annual Grammy Awards.

In the US, they were promoted in movies. NJOY partnered with Robert Pattinson for an e-cigarette advertisement, who appeared in the Twilight movies. Hollywood celebrities who have had their picture taken with a vape include Leonardo DiCaprio, Dennis Quaid, and Kevin Connolly. Vape websites have highlighted photographs of celebrity users.

External videos
- blu e-cigarette commercial featuring celebrity spokesperson Stephen Dorff.

A 2012 blu US television advertising campaign starred Stephen Dorff vaping, using the tagline "We are all adults here, it's time to take our freedom back."

=== Vape shop marketing ===
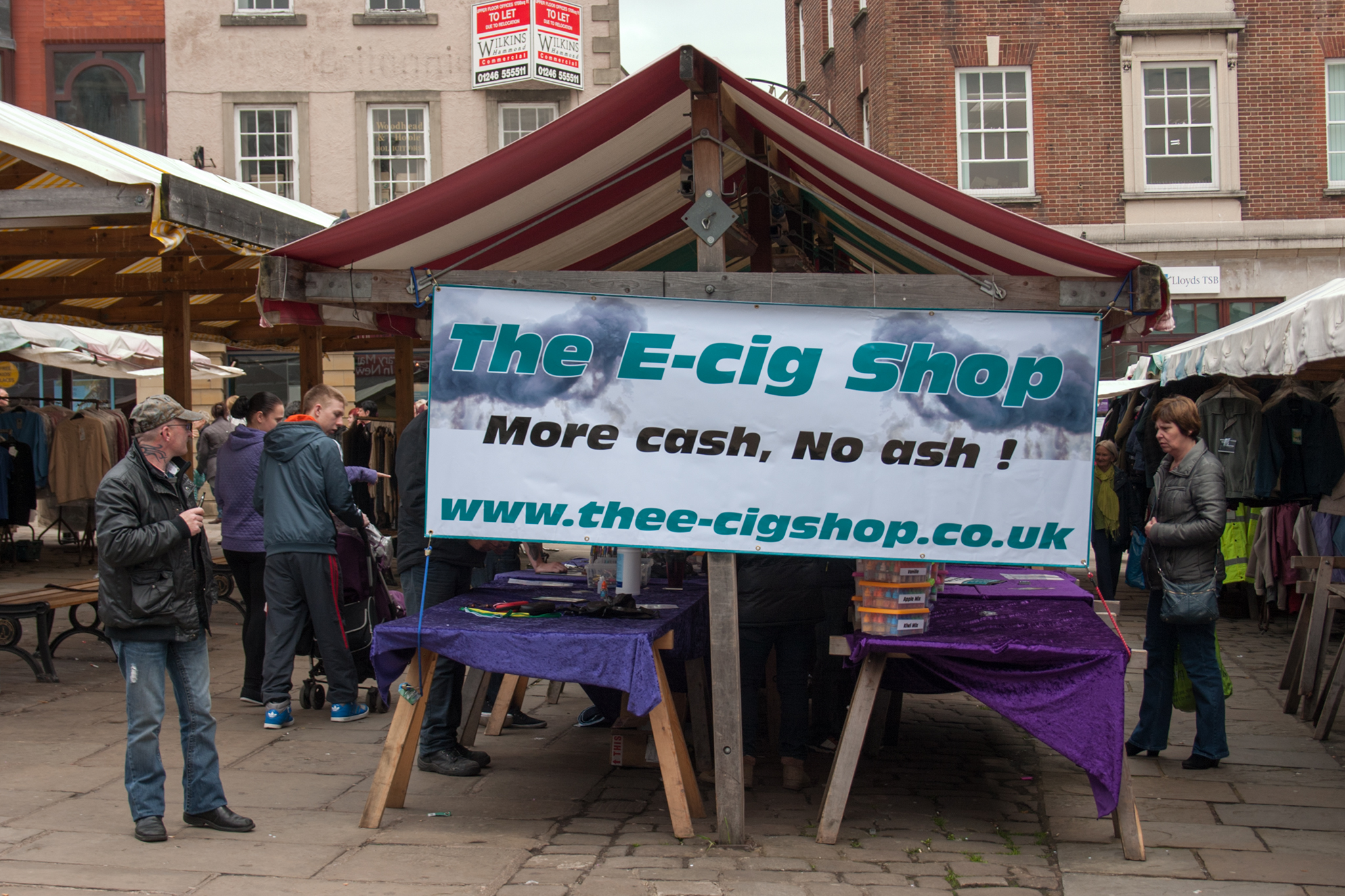
An e-cigarette advertisement sign

A 2017 study reported that vape shops can market e-cigarettes independently of makers. Social media is the most common medium. E.g. 100% use Facebook, 86% Instagram and Yelp, 65% Twitter, and 38% YouTube. Special events common (57%). Print and broadcast media are less common, although radio was somewhat popular (19%). 51% of stores had external advertisements, and two-thirds had signage targeting minors. Vape shops have used the game Pokémon Go to market their products.

A 2015 study found that vape shop marketing closely resembled tobacco company marketing strategies. Media included free samples, loyalty programs, sponsored events, direct mail, advertising through social media, and price promotions.

Shops use cloud-chasing contests to attract shoppers.

A 2018 report assessed e-liquid packaging and labeling in online shops in the Netherlands. They found that nicotine content was often noted, but health warnings were generally not visible on package photos nor on the website, unlike traditional cigarettes, which do. Age verification (only 25%) and health information were not uniformly present when buying either tobacco or e-cigarette products online.

Packaging and labeling of 25 randomly selected e-liquids available for sale in Dutch online shops.
Information on packaging or website	Not present (%)	Present (%)
Health warning visible on packaging	84	16
Health warning on website	80	20
Nicotine content indicated	0	100
Age verification	60	40
Notes: Information was obtained before the EU Tobacco Products Directive came into force.

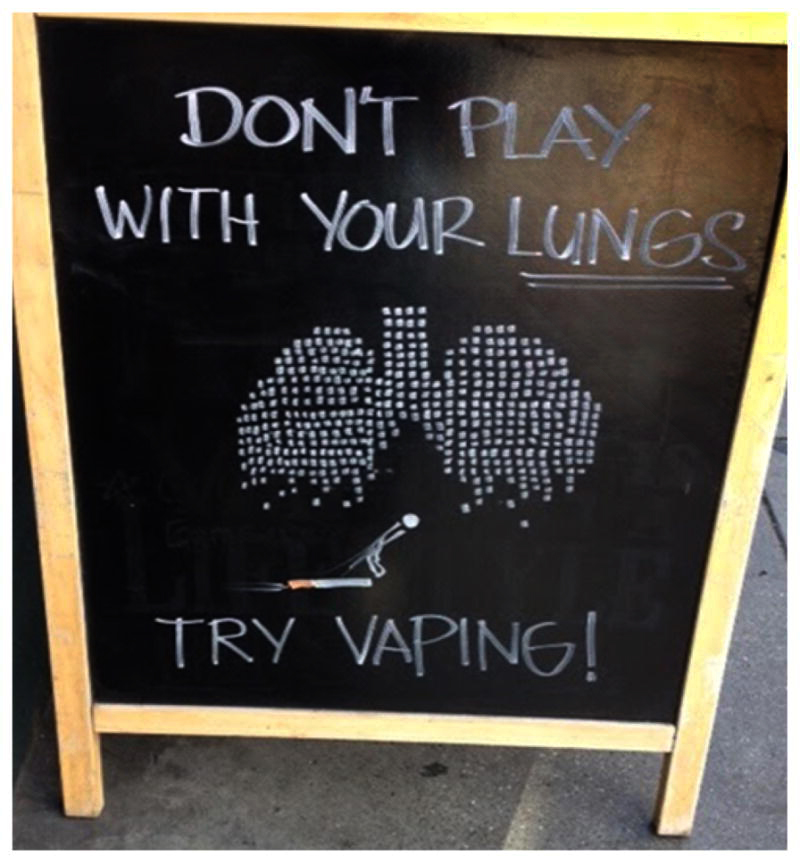
A sign outside of a vape shop suggesting vaping is safer than smoking

A 2018 study reported that tobacco shop marketing was limited. Only half used social media, with others relying on word of mouth and price promotions. As of 2016 in-store marketing was increasing.

== Impact ==
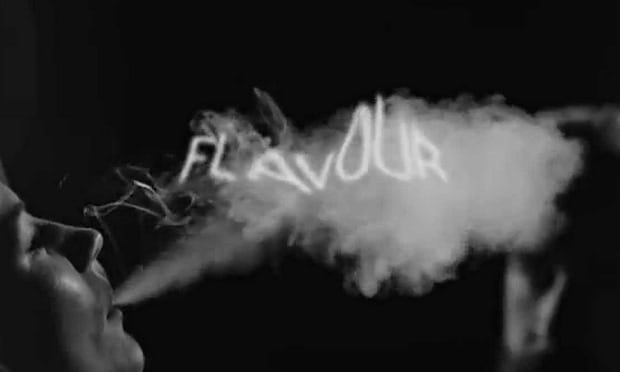
The television advertisement for Mirage e-cigarettes in 2015 depicted a man and woman vaping surrounded by plumes of aerosol (vapor). The advertisement included text that stated, "choice", "flavour", and "freedom".

A 2013 study claimed that marketing was contributing to an escalation in product awareness.

While tobacco advertising is banned in most countries, a 2014 review concluded television and radio e-cigarette advertising in several countries may be indirectly encouraging traditional smoking. A 2018 study linked seeing e-cigarette advertisements or at retail locations with positive views and greater likelihood of use.

Cigarette smokers were found to be more likely to be susceptible to advertisements than non-smokers. In a 2015 study of adult smokers and former smokers who saw a blu television advertisement, smokers stated that it caused them to question smoking (76%), giving up smoking (74%), and considering e-cigarettes (66%). The 34% of study participants who had vaped were much more likely to consider smoking compared with non-users.

A 2019 study reported an association between e-cigarette use and ads and social media promotions. A 2017 study reported that in high income countries, marketing led to a rise in the vaping. A 2017 study found that exposure to ads created the belief that vaping was safer than smoking in women and pregnant women and that youth "exposed to flavored e-cigarette advertisements rated them as more appealing than those exposed to non-flavored e-cigarette advertisements." By contrast, ads with warnings could strengthen e-cigarette harm perceptions, and lower purchase likelihood.

== Demographics ==
=== Women ===
VMR Products offered an e-cigarette called Vapor Couture directly targeting women. Vapor Couture comes in colors such as "deep purple" and "rose gold". Flavors such as "bombshell" and "strawberry champagne" are intended to appeal to women. Vapor Couture has been promoted its line through point-of-sale marketing and engaging with bloggers. A video advertisement stated, "break free from the pack" with the "slim, sleek, sparkling" devices in shades that come "straight off the runway". Vaping Vamps offered an e-cigarette that targeted women.

=== Youth/young adults ===
E-cigarette marketing has been accompanied by a rise in young adult vaping. The US National Youth Tobacco Survey (NYTS) reported that e-cigarettes have remained the most popular tobacco product among youth 2014-2024. Over 1.6 million youth, including 7.8% of high school students, were users.

In the 2021 NYTS, among youth 75.7% reported exposure to marketing or advertising for tobacco products; students who reported using social media, 73.5% said they had never seen e-cigarette–related content.

Children are at particular risk because relatively small amounts of substances such as nicotine could result in acute toxicity. Child poisonings due to the ingestion of liquid nicotine had increased as of 2018.

Given that the labeling and/or advertising on Unicorn Cakes e-liquid describes its nicotine content as 3 mg/mL, with a total volume of 120 mL, an accidental ingestion of slightly less than a teaspoon would reach the lower end of the fatal dose range for an average two-year-old. Additionally, an accidental ingestion of approximately 3% of a teaspoon would reach the lower end of the non-fatal acute toxicity range for an average two-year-old.

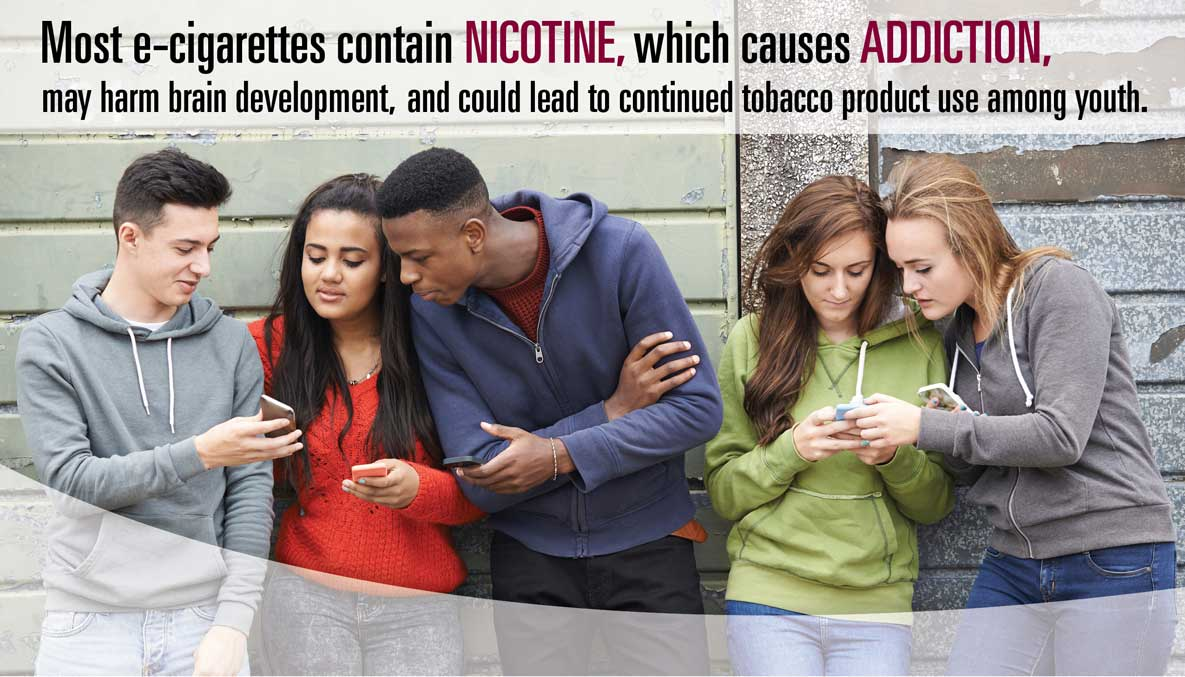
The United States Centers for Disease Control and Prevention released a 2016 report titled E-cigarette Ads and Youth which concerned marketing towards adolescents.

==== Product ====
Makers package their products using candy and fruit imagery in bright colors. The marketing of flavored e-cigarettes, which impacts youth curiosity in trying them, is a major concern. Fruity and sugary e-liquid flavorings such as bubble gum, cheesecake, gummy bear, cotton candy, peanut butter cup, and cookies 'n cream are used to target children.

A 2015 study reported that Independent e-cigarette businesses targeting youth presented them in creative packaging. Juul, as of 2018 the top-selling US e-cigarette, was then shaped like a USB flash drive.

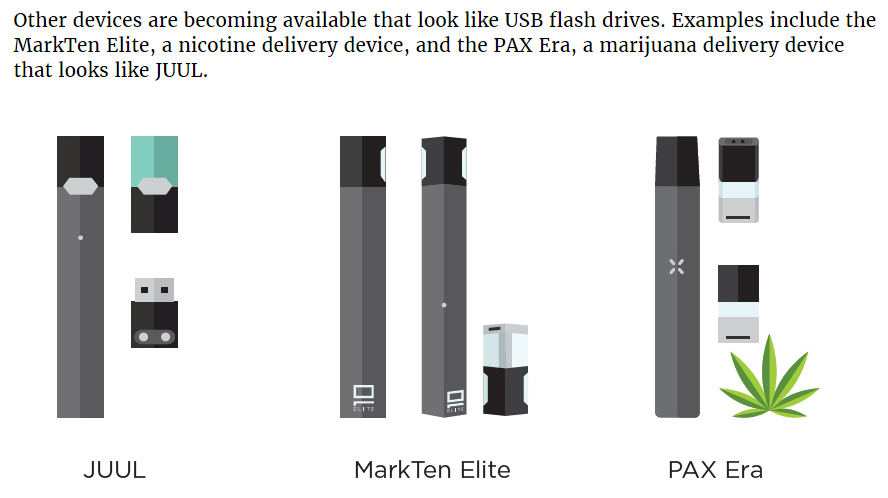
Graphic from the 2019 Centers for Disease Control and Prevention's report entitled E-cigarettes Shaped Like USB Flash Drives: Information for Parents, Educators and Health Care Providers

==== Messages ====
Themes in e-cigarette marketing, including sexual content, and customer satisfaction, are used to market many kinds of products, including traditional cigarettes, because of their appeal to broad audiences.Such influencers encouraged viewers to "take their freedom back." Cartoon characters such as "Hello Kitty" were used to promote vaping, even though they are prohibited in traditional cigarette advertising.

A 2014 study reported that e-cigarette marketing with themes of health and lifestyle may encourage non-smoking youth to try vaping. A 2017 study reported that the "safer than cigarettes" message was attracting young adults.

A 2017 scoping review concluded that e-cigarette makers were fostering a vaping culture to entice youth. A 2019 study reported that "over 90% of posts were related to lifestyle appeal, displaying pictures and videos meant to evoke feelings of relaxation, freedom, and sex appeal in the context of the JUUL product and flavor images."

==== Programs ====
Tobacco and e-cigarette companies continue to use sophisticated advertising to promote their products, as they have historically. They place ads on social media, sponsor music festivals and other events, host interactive photo booths, and distribute free samples. They also make and promote kid-friendly flavors like cotton candy and gummi bear. Youth use is a particular concern. A systematic review and meta analysis found e-cigarette use was clearly associated with current smoking and a "strong risk factor" for future smoking among youth.

A 2015 study reported that independent vendors used social media to offer price discounts. A 2018 study explored retail websites, marketing, and promotional campaigns and reported frequent appeals to adolescents by celebrities, use of cartoons, and claims of improved social activity and sex appeal. A 2015 study reported that often misleading marketing claims appealed to teens.

In 2018 several e-cigarette businesses offered scholarships in order to put their company name on university websites, including at Harvard, the University of California at Berkeley, and the University of Pittsburgh and other schools opposed to vaping. A 2017 study reported the use of college admissions message boards to host pro-vaping messages. A 2019 study reported e-cigarette companies inviting high school students to write articles about e-cigarette health benefits in return for a chance at a scholarship.

Four Scottish communities participated in a 2018 observational study that reported that in 36% of stores, e-cigarette material was placed near products popular to children.

E-cigarettes have been promoted using strategies that are not legally permissible for traditional cigarettes, including television, sports, and music event sponsorships, in-store self-service displays, and advertisements placed outside of brick-and-mortar businesses at children's eye level.

Juul closed its official Instagram account in 2018, although fan accounts such as the #Doit4Juul hashtag continued.

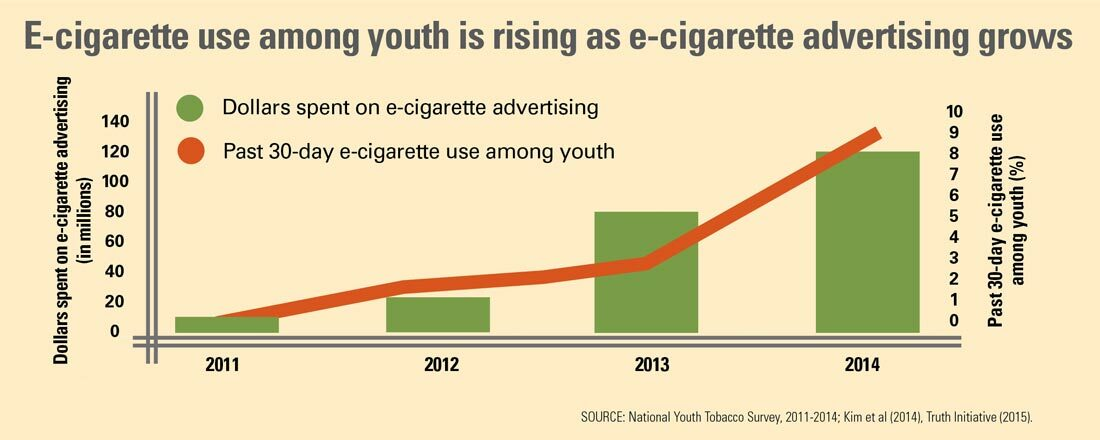
E-cigarette use among youth is rising as e-cigarette advertising increases.

==== Exposure ====
From 2011-2017 young adults saw increasing numbers of e-cigarette television advertisements, reaching 64% of US young adults as of 2015. A 2014 study reported that 82% of US young adults aged 18 to 21 (as well as 47% of teenagers) were exposed to magazine ads, declining to 57% as of 2015; venues included tabloids, entertainment weeklies, and men's lifestyle magazines. In 2014 the UK banned an ad for inappropriately appealing to children.

A 2014 study reported that age verification systems at multiple e-cigarette company websites failed to prevent youth from access and exposure to marketing materials. Only half of e-cigarette company websites included a minimum age notice. A 2014 report using advertising industry data reported that 73% of 12-17 year-olds were exposed to e-cigarette advertising from blu, the most heavily advertised brand at the time.

US ad exposure increased during 2014–2016 (2014: 68.9%; 2016: 78.2%). Youth exposure increased for retail stores (54.8% to 68.0%), decreased for newspapers and magazines (30.4% to 23.9%), and did not significantly change for the Internet or television. Retail stores were the most common exposure source (>50%), followed by television (44.5%), Internet (42.6%), and print media (<33%).

In 2016 in the US, ad exposure was greater than 70% for females (79.9%), males (76.5%); non-Hispanic whites (79.6%), Hispanics (77.0%), and others (73.6%), 6th graders (75.0%); high school students (79.2%), middle school students (76.9%); tobacco consumers (82.7%), and non-users (77.6%).

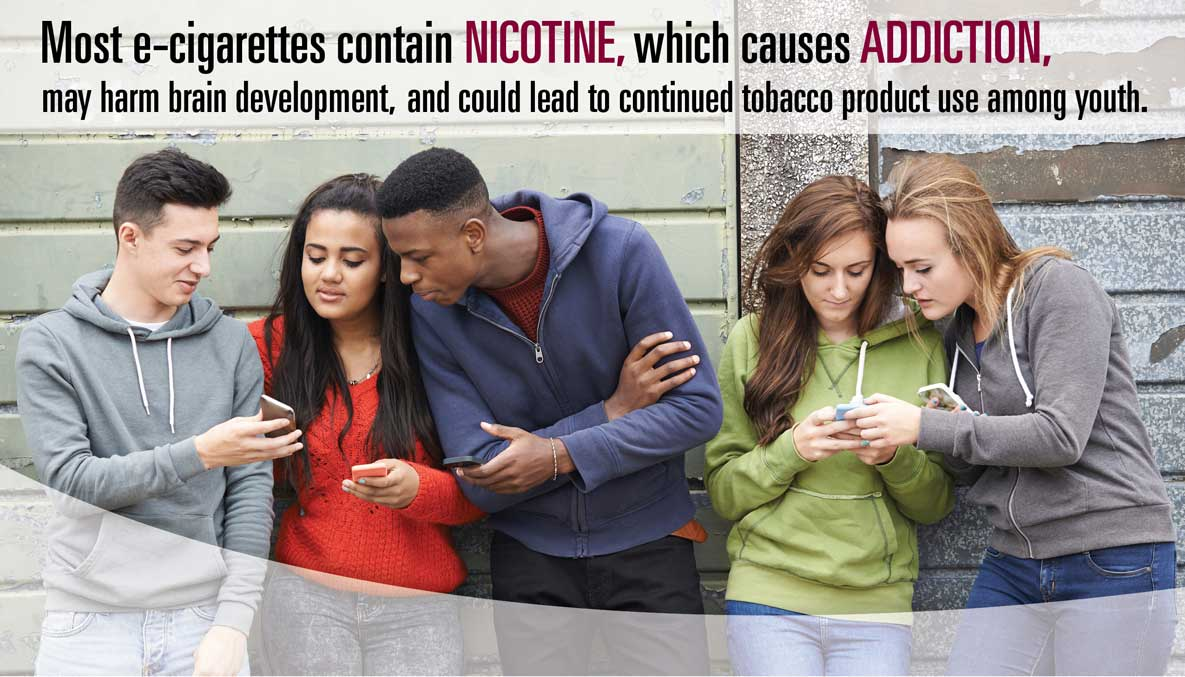
The United States CDC released a 2016 report titled E-cigarette Ads and Youth which concerned marketing towards adolescents.

In 2015, FDA stated that e-cigarette marketing had been aimed at children. By contrast, another 2015 report cited e-cigarette businesses claiming to not target children. Techniques such as easy availability, alluring advertisements, various e-liquid flavors, and safety claims helped them appeal to this age group.

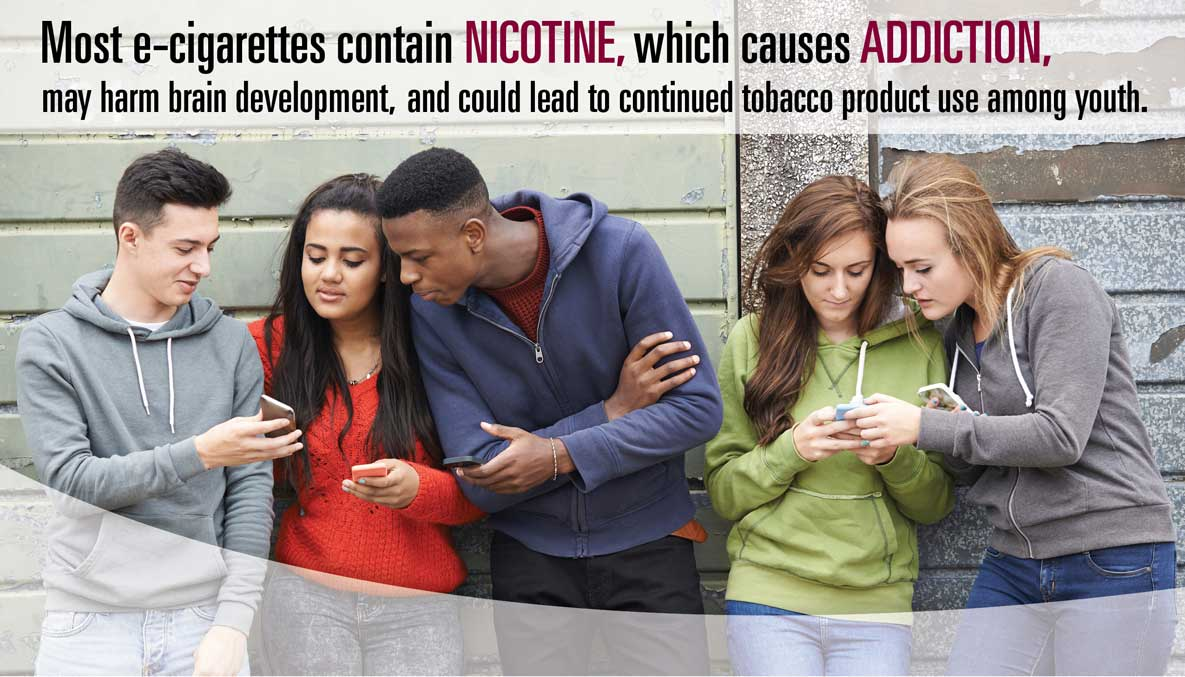
The United States Centers for Disease Control and Prevention released a 2016 report titled E-cigarette Ads and Youth which concerned marketing towards adolescents.

A 2015 study claimed that marketing was partly responsible for the increase in adolescent vaping. a 2015 study claimed that marketing led to an increase in e-cigarette use and experimentation by youth.

The long-term success of any market is dependent on recruiting new generations of consumers. In the case of tobacco, these beginners are typically children – few adults take up smoking – and the tobacco industry's dependence on selling to the young has become notorious. Similar concerns are apparent for e-cigarettes, with the production of variants such as e-shisha and flavoured and coloured offerings (with or without nicotine).

— Cancer Research UK

A 2016 study found 11–16-year-old English children exposed to e-cigarette ads that highlighting flavored increased appeal and interest. Another 2016 study reported that in 2014, about 70% of US middle school and high school students – more than 18 million – said they had seen e-cigarette advertising. Retail stores were the most frequent source of this advertising, followed by the internet, television and movies, and magazines and newspapers.

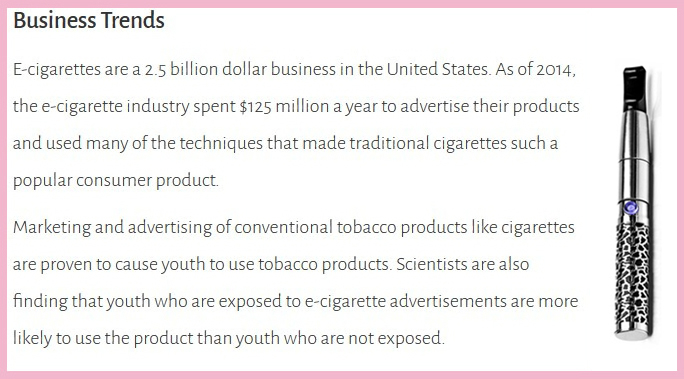
Graphic from the 2019 US Surgeon General's report entitled Business Trends

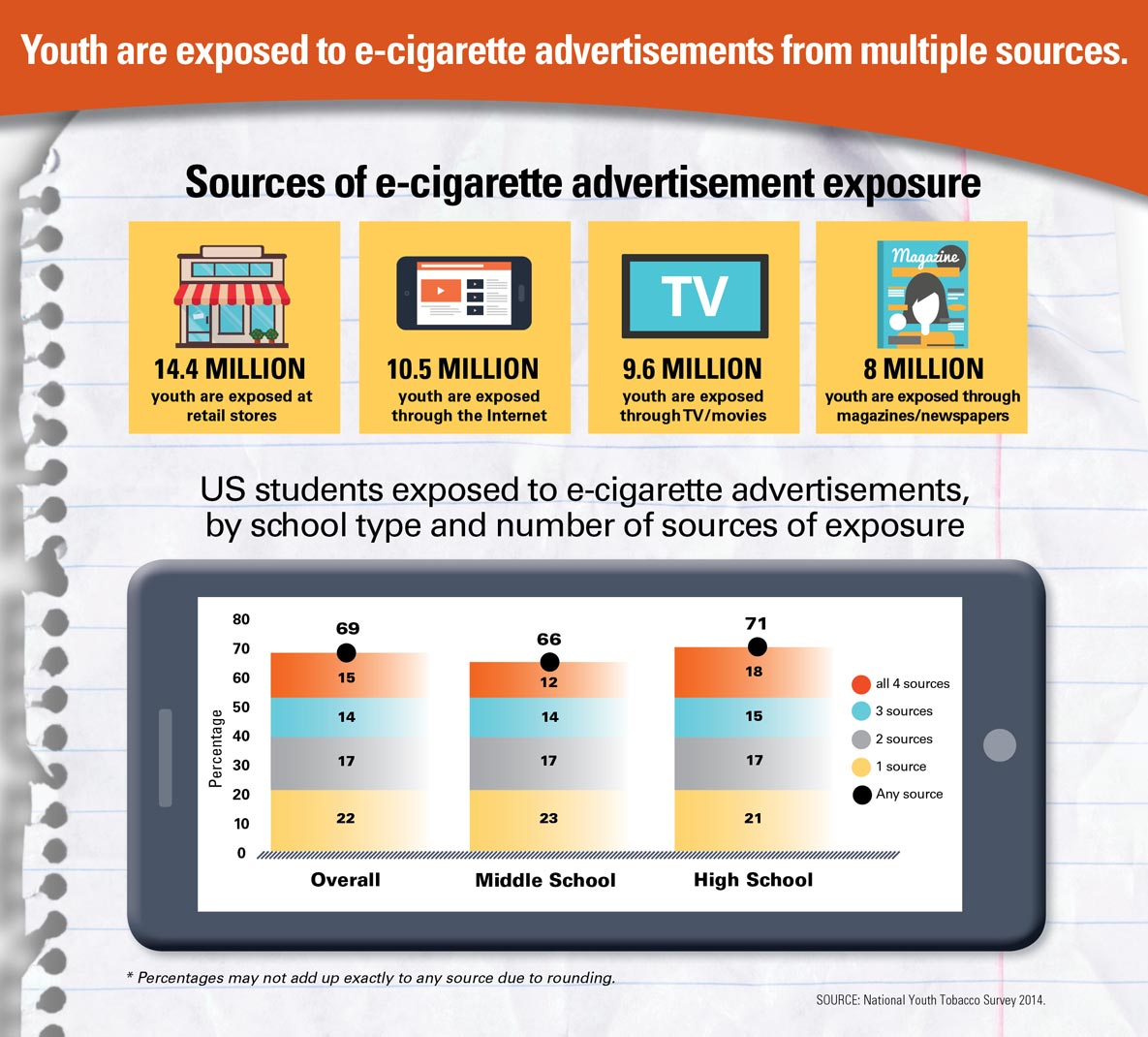
Adolescents are exposed to e-cigarette marketing in a number of ways, many of which are not available to traditional tobacco.

A 2018 study reported that young adults who were receptive to e-cigarette advertising were more likely to use traditional cigarettes, although smoking has continued to decline among all groups. A 2018 study reported that ad exposure was associated with higher odds of use among US middle and high school students.

The dual use of ECs and tobacco cigarettes is rising, and the growing popularity of ECs may promote the use of tobacco cigarettes in adolescents. Furthermore, despite EC manufacturer's claims of using marketing campaigns that target adults, not adolescents, ECs have achieved substantial penetration into youth markets worldwide.

— Cardiology in Review

A 2019 review stated:

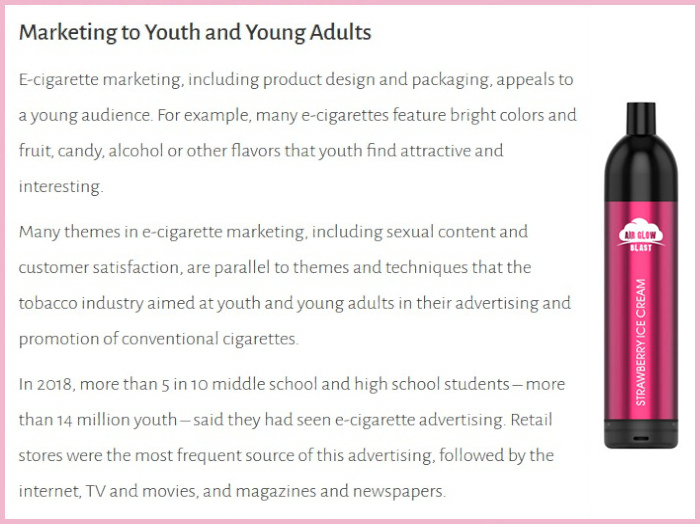
Graphic from the 2019 US Surgeon General's report Marketing to Youth and Young Adults

==== Investigations ====
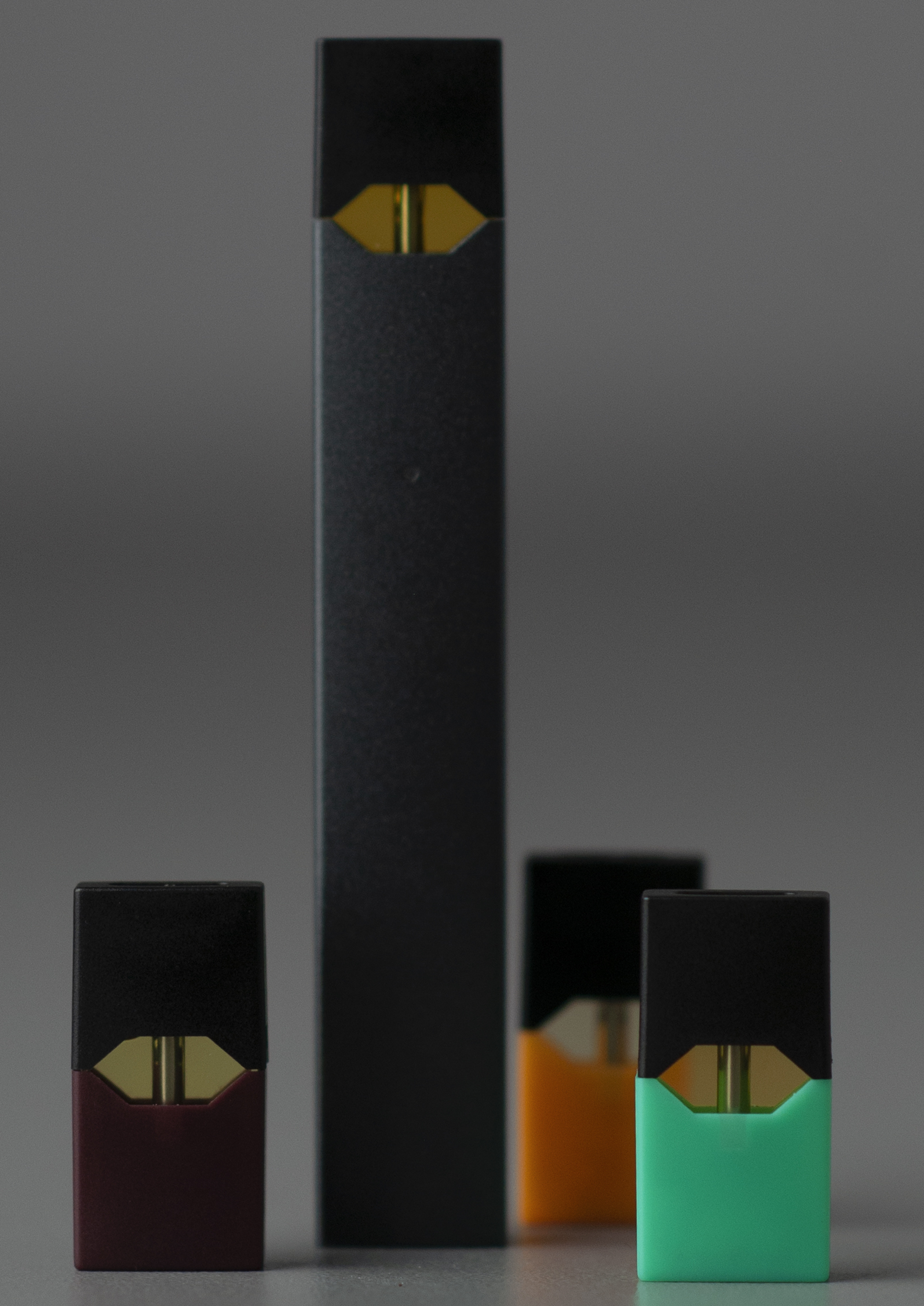
Juul e-cigarette with pods. The device looks like a USB flash drive.

In April 2018, the US FDA opened an investigation of Juul's marketing to assess whether they were marketing to youth, including an inspection of Juul headquarters. That year Massachusetts investigated online vendors. Attorney General Maura Healey sent cease and desist letters to two retailers who had not established age verification procedures. Attorney Mike Feuer claimed that VapeCo Distribution, NEwhere Inc., and Kandypens Inc. were marketing to minors. The city of Los Angeles claimed that companies were failing to provide an adequate age-verification system and their marketing was targeting minors. The city attorney accordingly sought an injunction.

FDA issued more than 1,300 warning letters and civil money penalty complaints (fines) to retailers who allegedly sold e-cigarette products to minors. In September FDA asked five makers to address the issue and issued 12 warning letters to online retailers. In October FDA wrote 21 e-cigarette companies, seeking information about their marketing programs.

In November, Juul announced that it would stop selling most of its flavored pods in retail stores, cease promoting its products on social media, and would allow store sales of flavored products only for outlets with an age verification system. Tobacco, mint, and menthol pods would still be sold to retailers.

In July 2019, law officials questioned Juul co-founder James Monsees. In August, Juul announced new protocols, including an age-verification point-of-sale system, called the Retail Access Control Standards (RACS) program. In October, Juul announced that it would suspend US sales of mango, creme, fruit, and cucumber flavors, and at its online store. Juul continued to offer flavored pods in other countries. In the Philippines Juul continued to sell fruit and other non-tobacco flavors.

Juul was accused of targeting schools, camps, and youth programs. In summer 2018, Juul sponsored a charter school with $134,000 to get them to circulate Juul materials on how to educate children about healthy lifestyles. In April 2017, a Juul spokesperson went to the Dwight School and told students that their e-cigarettes were "totally safe". Juul offered $10,000 to other schools to allow them to meet with students. A high school student said, "Juul went into their school and gave a presentation that was supposed to be about anti-vaping. After teachers left the room, Juul gave a presentation that painted Juul as healthy, and left kids believing that they could use it without health risks." In July 2019, Courthouse News Service stated that researcher Robert Jackler testified "that Monsees had said the use of the university's tobacco ad database was 'very helpful as they designed Juul's advertising.' Monsees denied making the statement." Courthouse News Service stated that Stanford had sent cease-and-desist letters to the company.

On September 9, the US FDA issued a warning letter to Juul for marketing unauthorized modified risk tobacco products. The agency issued a second letter concerning issues raised in a Congressional hearing regarding Juul's marking, including messages targeted at students, tribes, health insurers, and employers. FDA told Juul to amend its marketing practices. A Juul representative stated the company was "reviewing the letters and will fully cooperate".

In May 2018 the US FDA stated in a warning letter to Virtue Vape, LLC that Unicorn Cakes e-liquid was imitating a food product marketed toward children. The labeling/advertising included cartoon imagery of unicorns eating pancakes. Catalina Velasquez of Virtue Vape stated, "We never did it to connect with children, it was to remind grown-ups of when they were a kid."

==== Lawsuits ====
We're committed to the comprehensive approach to address addiction to nicotine that we announced last year. But at the same time, we see clear signs that youth use of electronic cigarettes has reached an epidemic proportion, and we must adjust certain aspects of our comprehensive strategy to stem this clear and present danger. This starts with the actions we're taking today to crack down on retail sales of e-cigarettes to minors. We will also revisit our compliance policy that extended the dates for manufacturers of certain flavored e-cigarettes to submit applications for premarket authorization. I believe certain flavors are one of the principal drivers of the youth appeal of these products. While we remain committed to advancing policies that promote the potential of e-cigarettes to help adult smokers move away from combustible cigarettes, that work can't come at the expense of kids. We cannot allow a whole new generation to become addicted to nicotine. In the coming weeks, we'll take additional action under our Youth Tobacco Prevention Plan to immediately address the youth access to, and the appeal of, these products.

— Scott Gottlieb

In 2015, three e-cigarette users filed a class action lawsuit for deceptive advertising against e-liquid maker Five Pawns. The suit contended that Five Pawns stated it had removed diacetyl from its e-liquids, that tests had revealed diacetyl and acetylpropionyl, that acetylpropionyl was present in more than a small amount, and that breathing in diacetyl and acetylpropionyl can lead to severe lung ailments, chronic obstructive pulmonary disease, and emphysema. The company denied the allegations and stated that the suit was "unfounded and without merit".

In 2018, two lawsuits against Juul contended that the company's products increased their nicotine addiction, that Juul falsely marketed the device as safe, that it contained higher concentrations of nicotine compared with traditional cigarettes and that Juul's marketing was attempting to attract non-smokers. One lawsuit stated that of two people who began using Juul one developed a nicotine addiction, while the other, a smoker, increased their nicotine addiction and consumption. Another lawsuit stated that the litigant, also a smoker, claimed that the Juul device worsened their nicotine addiction. A third lawsuit came from the mother of a teen who stated her son began using the Juul device at age 15 and became addicted. He was unable to quit using the device, the complaint contended, despite disciplinary measures at home and at school. The lawsuits highlighted Juul's early marketing, the company's patented formula, a study indicating that Juul may provide higher concentrations of nicotine than the company claimed, and that Juul profited from its social media promotions. Juul's Vaporized campaign depicted young people in billboards in Times Square and in Vice magazine, which was emphasized in the suits. "Juul Labs does not believe the cases have merit and will be defending them vigorously", a Juul representative stated in July 2018.

In May 2019, a family sued Juul Labs and Altria (owner of Philip Morris USA), which held a 35% interest in Juul. A student began using mango-flavored Juul at age 14 but claimed to not realize it contained nicotine. She had seizures after using the device, according to the suit. A Juul spokesperson stated, "JUUL Labs is committed to eliminating combustible cigarettes, the number one cause of preventable death in the world. Our product is intended to be a viable alternative for current adult smokers only. We do not want non-nicotine users, especially youth, to ever try our product. To this end, we have launched an aggressive action plan to combat underage use as it is antithetical to our mission. To the extent these cases allege otherwise, they are without merit and we will defend our mission throughout this process." That month North Carolina sued Juul, stating that the company targeted children. AG Josh Stein requested that a court restrict the number of flavors that the company sells and make sure that minors would not be able to purchase its products. In August 2019, Stein took legal action against eight e-cigarette businesses, stating that they were "unlawfully targeting children" and not mandating age-verification by retailers. The companies were Beard Vape, Direct eLiquid, Electric Lotus, Electric Tobacconist, Eonsmoke, Juice Man, Tinted Brew, and VapeCo.

In July 2019, a teenager sued Juul in New Jersey, stating that when he was 16 he started using Juul. After a year, he stated he was using two pods every day. "He would JUUL during class, at home, while driving, practically anywhere that he could get away with it. He struggled to function without nicotine, and when he tried to quit using the product, he would have mood swings and become irritable," according to the lawsuit. "Like the prior cases that this one copies, it is without merit and we will defend our mission throughout this process," the company Juul stated.

In August 2019, a mother in Clay County, Missouri sued Juul in federal court, stating that the company "developed a marketing strategy" that targets youth, such as her daughter, who were in danger of developing a nicotine addiction. Juul stated that the lawsuit was "without merit."They also stated, "We have never marketed to youth and do not want any non-nicotine users to try our products. Last year, we launched an aggressive action plan to combat underage use as it is antithetical to our mission." The suit claimed that the daughter began vaping at age 14 in 2018.

Also in August 2019, Lake County, Illinois sued Juul, stating the company had downplayed the effects of nicotine and other e-liquid substances. The suit alleged that the company targeted underage individuals. The company replied that Juul was focused on switching adult smokers to e-cigarettes and denied ever marketing to youth. The suit claimed that Juul used social media to influence young people to post selfies of themselves vaping. The company responded that it had exited Instagram and Facebook and worked to remove inappropriate content generated by others.

=== Non-smokers ===
A 2017 review reported that e-cigarettes were marketed to non-smokers. A 2017 scoping review reported that e-cigarette makers were attempting to forge a vaping culture that entices non-smokers. In a 2019 study, these authors claimed that promotion of e-cigarettes may encourage non-smokers, particularly young people, to experiment with traditional tobacco products.

Offering products designed to resemble traditional cigarettes and lure smokers to switch to vaping might have the opposite effect, letting vapers think that smoking was basically the same thing.

== E-liquid marketing ==
=== Product ===
E-liquids are often flavored. A 2010 study suggested that e-cigarettes were marketed in 7764 different flavors. Popular options included fruit, candy, and dessert.

A 2010 study reported that some e-liquid contents did not match their label. One product claimed to include tadalafil, but instead contained its analogue amino-tadalafil. Another was contaminated with an oxidative impurity of its primary ingredient, rimonabant. Others contained unlabeled nicotine.

Products may be marketed as sweet, and include sweeteners. A 2018 study reported that 37 e-liquid samples contained sucrose. A 2016 study reported that sweeter flavors were more enticing than others among young adult frequent vapers.

=== Messages ===
Some e-liquid ads show the liquid flowing from a unicorn in a rainbow of colors. Flavors included unicorn milk, unicorn cream, unicorn juice, unicorn magic, unicorn blood, unicorn poop, unicorn piss, unicorn tears, unicorn puke, unicorn vomit, unicorn spew, unicorn breath, unicorn jizz, unicorn porn, unicorn sprinkles, unicorn dust, unicorn cake, unicorn horn, unicorn slayer, unicorn killer, unicorn revenge, unicorn roar, and unicorn clouds.

=== Programs ===
At the 2017 World Vapor Expo samples of candy-flavored e-liquids were provided along with matching candy samples.

=== Packaging ===
E-liquid companies have used cartoons to promote their products, including using cartoon imagery as part of their logo, such as unicorn-themed e-liquids. Other packages the labeling of cookies, juice boxes, and whipped cream. Some e-liquids may have labeling or advertising that misleads youth into thinking the products are things they would eat or drink – like a juice box, piece of candy, or cookie. Examples included One Mad Hit Juice Box, Vape Heads Sour Smurf Sauce, and V'Nilla Cookies & Milk, Whip'd Strawberry, and Twirly Pop.

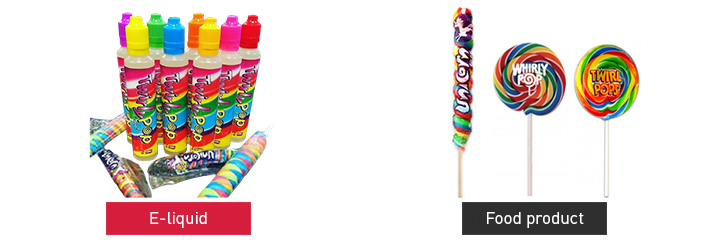
The US Food and Drug Administration stated, in a warning letter to Omnia E-Liquid on May 1, 2018, that the labeling and/or advertising of the e-liquid looks very similar to lollipops that are marketed toward, and/or appealing to, children, such as Unicorn Pops, Whirly Pop, and Twirl Pops lollipops. They stated that the Twirly Pop e-liquid has a scent like Unicorn Pops lollipops, and that the two products had been packaged together.

== Regulation ==
=== International ===
Regulations for e-cigarette advertising vary internationally. Many countries lack specific e-cigarette regulations or are not subject to the same restrictions as traditional cigarettes. Brazil prohibited the selling and advertising of e-cigarettes in 2013, whereas Finland treated them as medical products and prohibited only advertising. As of 2017 48 countries worldwide had implemented e-cigarette regulations. As of 2025, the World Health Organization reported that 133 countries regulate vapes and similar devices in some way.

The sale of nicotine e-cigarettes is prohibited in 13 of the 59 countries that regulate such products, according to a 2014 World Health Organization report. Most allowed nicotine e-cigarettes to be sold to the general population. The report also listed 29 countries regulate sales to minors.

A 2016 World Health Organization report suggested regulating advertising, promotion, and sponsorships.

E-cigarettes containing nicotine are listed as drug delivery devices in some countries, and marketing was restricted.

Organizations such as the Electronic Cigarette Association, Consumer Advocates for Smoke-Free Alternatives Association, and Vapers International, Inc., lobbied to impede restrictions.

=== United States ===
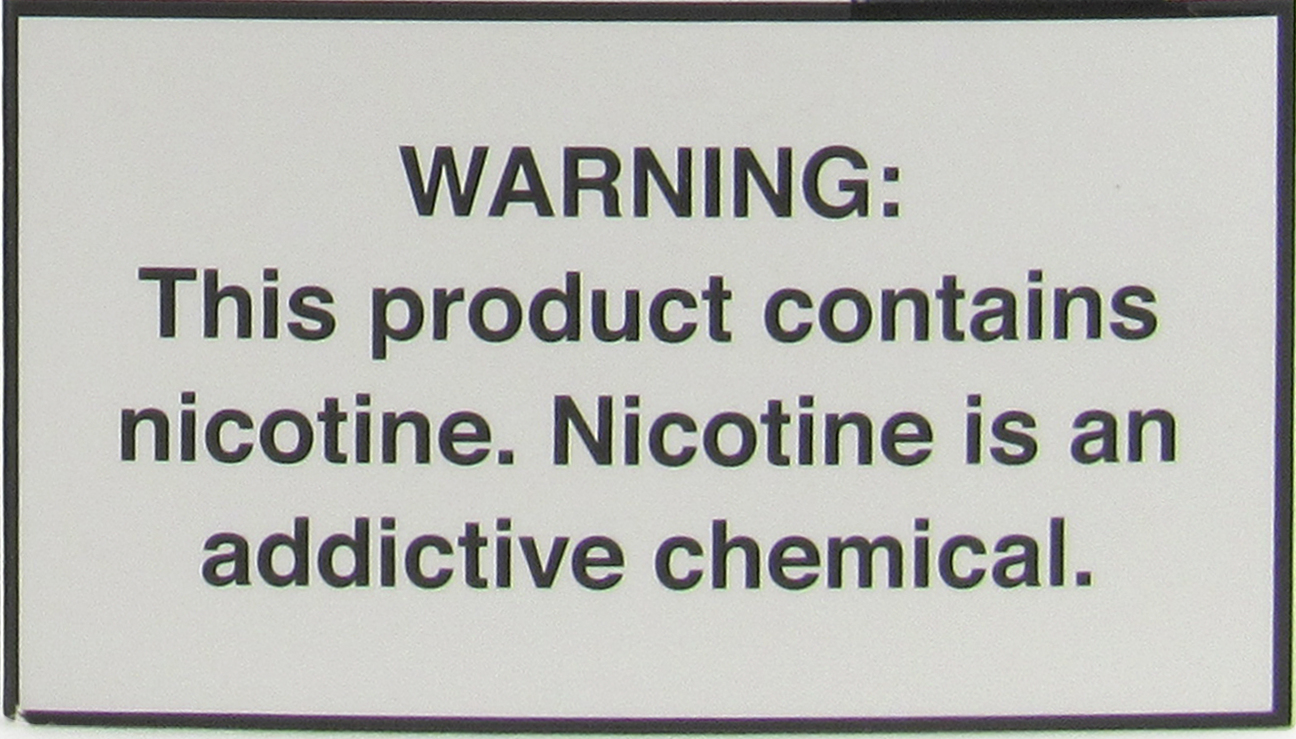
A nicotine warning statement for vaping products sold in the US

The Family Smoking Prevention and Tobacco Control Act of 2009 banned the sale of flavored cigarettes except for menthol. The law did not prohibit other flavored tobacco products.

A 2010 District Court decision blocked makers from marketing e-cigarettes as smoking reduction aids. However, advertisers used indirect tactics such as affiliate marketing to advance claims about the products' health and safety profile and their role in smoking cessation.

A 2016 report claimed that organized opposition to regulation began in 2013.

As of 2015, the US had few restrictions in on e-cigarette marketing and none on advertising, with testing not required prior to marketing.

FDA began regulating the manufacturing, marketing, and sales of e-cigarette products as tobacco products in 2016. Effective May 10, 2018, US vape retailers were required to include health warnings on the package and on advertisements. The Tobacco Master Settlement Agreement forbids tobacco companies from using cartoon characters.

In April 2025, the U.S. Supreme Court vacated a Fifth Circuit decision and held that the Food and Drug Administration’s marketing denial orders for certain flavored e-cigarette products did not unlawfully depart from the agency’s prior guidance. A Congressional Research Service summary noted that, as of January 2025, FDA had authorized some tobacco- and menthol-flavored e-cigarettes for legal marketing, but had not authorized dessert-, candy-, or fruit-flavored products.

Internet marketers claimed that regulating vaping would constrain innovation and restrict smoking alternatives.

As of 2017, the marketing of other flavored products was widely permitted, and makers introduced flavored products. In the years leading up to 2017, tobacco makers substantially increased marketing flavored non-cigarette tobacco products, including e-cigarettes and cigars.

In 2017, San Francisco banned sales of all flavored nicotine products. This law stemmed from concerns that these products targeted youth and people of color. Reynolds Tobacco Company collected sufficient signatures for a referendum for San Francisco voters. Despite $12 million spent against the ban, voters passed Proposition E that effectively banned the sale of flavored tobacco products, including flavored e-liquids on June 5, 2018.

As of 2018 several US jurisdictions had passed laws that increased the minimum age of sale for e-cigarettes to 21 years. In June 2019, San Francisco banned the sale of e-cigarettes. In June 2019, Beverly Hills banned the sale of cigarettes, cigars, e-cigarettes and other tobacco products.

FDA announced its Comprehensive Plan for Tobacco and Nicotine Regulation in July 2017. In 2018 FDA banned the sale of e-liquid flavors at convenience stores and gas stations. Tobacco, mint, and menthol flavors were allowed at convenience stores, gas stations, and other points of sale. Fruity flavors were restricted to adult-only outlets, such as vape shops.

In July 2019, FDA launched its first ad campaign aimed at preventing teen vaping on TeenNick, The CW, ESPN and MTV, as well as streaming sites, social media and other teen-focused media.

Following concerns over cases of vaping-induced lung illness and deaths in the US in 2019, CNN stopped advertisements from vaping companies. CBS, WarnerMedia, and Viacom stopped accepting vaping ads.

=== Europe ===
==== European Union ====
The revised EU Tobacco Products Directive came into effect in May 2016, regulating e-cigarettes. It limited advertising in print, on television and radio, while reducing nicotine levels in liquids and limiting the flavors used. This law does regulate products that do not contain nicotine. The directive did not regulate posters, leaflets, or point of sale e-cigarette advertisements. It also does not regulate marketing materials that portray them as glamorous. Promotion of e-cigarettes and e-liquids in print media, television, or radio media is banned. Promotional materials on the packaging of such products is banned. Advertising and promotion of e-cigarettes is banned in neighboring countries. The law still allows certain types of e-cigarette advertising such as posters, leaflets, and billboards in shops. A 2014 review stated that tobacco and e-cigarette businesses interact with consumers for their policy agenda. The businesses use websites, social media, and marketing to get consumers involved in opposing bills that include e-cigarettes in smoke-free laws. This is similar to tobacco industry activity going back to the 1980s. These approaches were used in Europe to minimize the EU Tobacco Products Directive in October 2013.

==== Switzerland ====
Switzerland has tobacco legislation defined at federal and cantonal level. It covers protection of the population against passive smoking, restrictions on tobacco advertising, warnings on packaging and taxes.

The Federal Act on Tobacco Products and Electronic Cigarettes (TobPA) came into force on 1 October 2024. It harmonised a series of measures at the federal level.

==== Belgium ====
Belgium became the first European Union member state to ban the sale of disposable e-cigarettes, with the ban taking effect on 1 January 2025. Belgian officials showed concern about youth uptake and environmental impacts caused from single-use devices.

==== United Kingdom ====
The Advertising Standards Authority (ASA) banned two E-Lites ads and a television advertisement by SKYCIG (now known as blu eCigs or simply blu) in 2013. The E-Lites ads were banned because they did not make it evident that the product delivered nicotine. In 2014, ASA banned a Ten Motives ad for unproven health claims. In 2014, ASA banned a Vype television advertisement for e-cigarettes because it potentially promoted vaping as a way to quit smoking. Revised advertising regulations for e-cigarettes in the UK were announced in October 2014.

In 2014, ASA banned a VIP ad for glamorizing smoking. In 2015, ASA banned a Mirage Cigarettes television advertisement for e-cigarettes for appearing to promote tobacco use. ASA banned a billboard ad that depicted Santa Claus vaping for its appeal to underage individuals. ASA banned a billboard ad with an elf and another with a gingerbread man. In August 2019, ASA banned a Diamond Mist Eliquids advertisement that suggested Olympic athlete Mo Farah had endorsed the product.

=== Canada ===
In 2014, e-cigarettes were technically illegal to sell or advertise, but this is not generally enforced and they are commonly available for sale.

In November 2015, Bill 44 was passed by the National Assembly, regulating e-cigarettes as tobacco products in Quebec, Canada. It banned vaping in vape shops, banned indoor displays and advertising, and banned online sales.

In May 2018, Bill S-5 introduced regulations for e-cigarettes and other tobacco products. It did not allow the promotion of e-cigarettes that are enticing to youth. This included limiting flavor choices. It banned the advertising of e-cigarettes as a lifestyle product. It restricted various kinds of e-cigarette promotions, including sponsorships and celebrity endorsements.
