= C19H19N =

The molecular formula C_{19}H_{19}N (molar mass: 261.36 g/mol, exact mass: 261.1517 u) may refer to:

- Phenindamine (Nolahist, Thephorin)
- Setiptiline, or teciptiline
