= Pharmaceutics =

Science of the properties of medicines

Pharmaceutics is the discipline of pharmacy that deals with the process of turning a new chemical entity (NCE) or an existing drug into a medication to be used safely and effectively by patients. The patients could be either humans or animals. Pharmaceutics helps relate the formulation of drugs to their delivery and disposition in the body. Pharmaceutics deals with the formulation of a pure drug substance into a dosage form.

== Description ==
Pharmaceutics is also called the science of dosage form design. There are many chemicals with pharmacological properties, but need special measures to help them achieve therapeutically relevant amounts at their sites of action.

== Branches ==
Branches of pharmaceutics include:

- Pharmaceutical formulation
- Pharmaceutical manufacturing
- Dispensing pharmacy
- Pharmaceutical technology
- Physical pharmacy
- Pharmaceutical jurisprudence

== History ==
Pharmaceutics deals with the formulation of a pure drug substance into a dosage form. Pure drug substances are usually white crystalline or amorphous powders. Before the advent of medicine as a science, it was common for pharmacists to dispense drugs as is. Most drugs today are administered as parts of a dosage form. The clinical performance of drugs depends on their form of presentation to the patient. Of prescription drug products approved for marketing yearly in United States, most pharmaceutical manufacturers are located outside of the United States.

== Education ==
Pharmaceutics is a specialization in the field of pharmacy. Typically, Master of Pharmacy postgraduates can choose to continue studies in this field towards a PhD degree. In a study surveying over 20,000 American adults, 62.3% reported medication use. In 2025, prescription drug spending in the U.S. cost $915 billion and made up eleven percent of the cost in health care. The Food and Drug Administration (FDA) maintains control of the advertising of prescription drugs; patent protection grants new drug molecules 20 years of patent exclusivity, which prohibits generic manufacturers from creating bioequivalent products during this period. Fifty-five percent of the FDA budget is authorized medication.

== See also ==
- List of pharmaceutical companies
- Pharmacognosy
- Pharmaceutical industry
- Nicholas Culpeper – 17th-century English physician who translated and used "pharmacological texts"
