= Journal of Medicinal Chemistry =

- Discipline: Medicinal chemistry
- Language: English
- Edited by: Craig W. Lindsley

Publication details
- Former names: Journal of Medicinal and Pharmaceutical Chemistry
- History: 1959-present
- Publisher: American Chemical Society (United States)
- Frequency: Biweekly
- Impact factor: 7.3 (2025)

Standard abbreviations
- ISO 4: J. Med. Chem.

Indexing
- CODEN: JMCMAR
- ISSN: 0022-2623 (print); 1520-4804 (web)
- LCCN: a63000643
- OCLC no.: 39480771

Links
- Journal homepage; Online access; Online archive

The Journal of Medicinal Chemistry is a biweekly peer-reviewed medical journal covering research in medicinal chemistry. It is published by the American Chemical Society. It was established in 1959 as the Journal of Medicinal and Pharmaceutical Chemistry and obtained its current name in 1963. Philip S. Portoghese served as editor-in-chief from 1972 to 2011. In 2012, Gunda Georg (University of Minnesota) and Shaomeng Wang (University of Michigan) succeeded Portoghese (University of Minnesota). In 2021, Craig W. Lindsley (Vanderbilt University) became editor-in-chief. According to the Journal Citation Reports, the journal has a 2025 impact factor of 7.3.

== See also ==
- ACS Medicinal Chemistry Letters
