= Derek Yach =

South African public health scholar

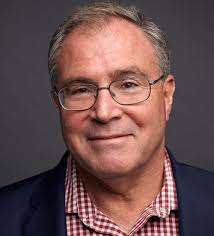
- Alma mater: Stellenbosch University; Johns Hopkins Bloomberg School of Public Health; University of Cape Town; Wynberg Boys' High School
- Employer: Vitality Institute; Foundation for a Smoke-Free World (2017–2021); PepsiCo; Rockefeller Foundation; World Health Organization; Yale University

Derek Yach (born 21 November 1955) is a global public health expert and former president of the Foundation for a Smoke-Free World. He is a former employee of the World Health Organization, Yale University, The Rockefeller Foundation, and PepsiCo. Currently, he is active as a global health advocate and independent consultant specializing in chronic conditions, mental health wellbeing, and leveraging the intersection of private and public entities with emerging technologies.

== Education ==
He received his MBChB from the University of Cape Town in 1979, his BSc (Hons Epi) from Stellenbosch University in 1982, and his MPH from Johns Hopkins Bloomberg School of Public Health in 1985. In 2007, he received an honorary DSc from Georgetown University.

== Career ==
Yach's career has spanned over four decades, during which he has held numerous leadership roles in both the public and private sectors:

- Centre for Epidemiological Research: Founder and Director, developing a national infrastructure for epidemiological research in South Africa (1985–1995).
- WHO: Executive Director for Noncommunicable Diseases and Mental Health, spearheading initiatives like the WHO Framework Convention on Tobacco Control and the Global Strategy on Diet and Physical Activity.
- Yale University: Professor of Global Health
- The Rockefeller Foundation: Director of Global Health
- PepsiCo: Senior Vice President of Global Health and Agriculture Policy (2007–2012)
- Vitality Institute: Executive Director (2012–2015), Chief Health Officer (2015–2017), and Senior Vitality Consultant (March–August 2017)
- Foundation for a Smoke-Free World: Founder and President (2017–2021)
- Global Health Strategies LLC: Independent consultant (2021–present)

== Memberships and associations ==
Yach serves on several advisory boards, including the NIH’s John E. Fogarty International Center, the Board of Directors of Cornerstone Capital Group, and the Wellcome Trust’s Sustaining Health Committee. e has also served as a board member of multiple health organizations and has been involved in mentoring activities within the public health field.

== Publications ==
Yach has authored or co-authored over 250 peer-reviewed articles in prestigious journals such as Science, Nature, The BMJ, and The Lancet. His work has been widely recognized and cited by major media outlets.

== Awards and honors ==
Yach has received numerous accolades, including an honorary Doctor of Science from Georgetown University and being a finalist for the Nelson Mandela Award in South Africa.

== Personal Interests ==
Yach is an open water swimmer and works on integrating artificial intelligence with biotechnology to support public health outcomes.
