= Enecadin =

Sodium and calcium channel blocker

Clinical data
- Other names: NS-7

Identifiers
- IUPAC name: 4-(4-Fluorophenyl)-2-methyl-6-(5-piperidin-1-ylpentoxy)pyrimidine
- CAS Number: 259525-01-4 178429-67-9
- PubChem CID: 6433114
- DrugBank: DB13032
- ChemSpider: 4938302
- UNII: VR034VW8OG
- ChEMBL: ChEMBL29404
- CompTox Dashboard (EPA): DTXSID30948865

Chemical and physical data
- Formula: C_{21}H_{28}FN_{3}O
- Molar mass: 357.473 g·mol^{−1}
- 3D model (JSmol): Interactive image
- SMILES: CC1=NC(=CC(=N1)OCCCCCN2CCCCC2)C3=CC=C(C=C3)F
- InChI: InChI=1S/C21H28FN3O/c1-17-23-20(18-8-10-19(22)11-9-18)16-21(24-17)26-15-7-3-6-14-25-12-4-2-5-13-25/h8-11,16H,2-7,12-15H2,1H3; Key:SZSHJTJCJOWMHM-UHFFFAOYSA-N

Enecadin (NS-7) was an investigational new drug developed as a neuroprotectant for use following cerebral infarction (stroke). It was originally discovered by Nippon Shinyaku and later out-licensed to Schering in 1999.

Enecadin exerts its neuroprotective effects by blocking voltage-gated sodium and calcium channels, which play key roles in excitotoxicity during ischemic injury. By limiting pathological ion influx, the compound was shown to preserve neuronal integrity in experimental models of stroke, spinal cord injury, and retinal ischemia.

The drug advanced to Phase II clinical trials for acute ischemic stroke, but development was discontinued after the trial was terminated.

== Synthesis ==
Patent:

A Claisen-Schmidt reaction between p-fluoroacetophenone [403-42-9] (1) and diethyl carbonate [105-58-8] (2) gives ethyl 3-(4-fluorophenyl)-3-oxopropanoate [1999-00-4] (3). Treatment with acetamidine hydrochloride [124-42-5] (4) leads to the formation of 4-(4-fluorophenyl)-6-hydroxy-2-methylpyrimidine [178430-09-6] (5). Halogenation with phosphoryl chloride led to 4-chloro-6-(4-fluorophenyl)-2-methylpyrimidine [178430-13-2] (6). Williamson ether synthesis with 5-piperidino-1-pentanol [2937-83-9] (7) completed the synthesis of Enecadin (8).

== See also ==
- p-fluoroacetophenone finds dual use in the synthesis of Flazalone.
