= Shaomeng Wang =

Chinese-American chemist

Shaomeng Wang is a Chinese-American chemist currently the Warner-Lambert/Parke-Davis Professor in Medicine at University of Michigan American Chemical Society's Journal of Medicinal Chemistry. A cited expert in his field, he is an are synthesis and design of moleculars, neurological diseases and computational and informatics. He was Elected as Fellow at the National Academy of Inventors in 2014. Dr. Wang was named to the AAAS Fellows Section on Pharmaceutical Sciences in 2019, and is the recipient of the Division of Medicinal Chemistry Award 2020 American Chemical Society.

== Education ==
He earned his B.S. in Chemistry at Peking University and his Ph.D at Case Western Reserve University. He later began teaching at Georgetown University and University of Michigan Medical School.

== Publications ==
- Comparative evaluation of 11 scoring functions for molecular docking, Renxiao Wang, Yipin Lu, Shaomeng Wang, Journal of medicinal chemistry, 2003
- Temporal activation of p53 by a specific MDM2 inhibitor is selectively toxic to tumors and leads to complete tumor growth inhibition, Proceedings of the National Academy of Sciences, 2008
- Structure-based design of spiro-oxindoles as potent, specific small-molecule inhibitors of the MDM2− p53 interaction, Journal of medicinal chemistry, 2006
- The PDBbind database: Collection of binding affinities for protein− ligand complexes with known three-dimensional structures, Journal of medicinal chemistry, 2004
- Structure-based design of potent non-peptide MDM2 inhibitors, Journal of the American Chemical Society, 2005
- Small-molecule inhibitors of the MDM2-p53 protein-protein interaction to reactivate p53 function: a novel approach for cancer therapy, Annual review of pharmacology and toxicology, 2009
- A low-molecular-weight compound discovered through virtual database screening inhibits Stat3 function in breast cancer cells, Hui Song, Renxiao Wang, Shaomeng Wang, Jiayuh Lin, Proceedings of the National academy of Sciences of the United States of America, 2005

== Compounds developed by Shaomeng Wang ==
- Flazalone
- TW-37
- CJ-998
- Hydroxycoumarin tetramer
- CJ-1882
