= Gunda Georg =

Gunda I. Georg is a chemist who is currently a Professor of Medicinal Chemistry, Regents Professor, McKnight Presidential Chair, Robert Vince Endowed Chair at University of Minnesota and a former Co-Editor-in-Chief of American Chemical Society's Journal of Medicinal Chemistry. Her research interests are total synthesis and semisynthesis as well as evaluating biologically active agents. A cited expert in her field, she was elected to the American Association for the Advancement of Science in 1996 and inducted in the Medicinal Chemistry Hall of Fame in 2017. In 2019, she was announced as the 2020 winner and first woman to receive the Alfred Burger Award in Medicinal Chemistry (established by GlaxoSmithKline, now sponsored by Gilead). She along with chemists, Shameem Syeda and Gustavo Blanco, are leading researchers in male contraception. Dr Georg also works with her research groups to conduct research on Alzheimer's disease, epilepsy and cancer experimental therapeutics.

== Education ==
She earned her B.S. in 1975 and Ph.D. in 1980 from Philipps Universitat Marburg.

== Career ==
Georg is the Principal Investigator for a National Institutes of Health Center grant for the Contraceptive Discovery, Development and Behavioral Research Center funded from 2017 to 2021. The grant work is in five interdisciplinary groups that are working on the discovery and development of non-hormonal male contraceptive agents and the investigation of contraceptive use.

Georg's work is described in over 250 peer-reviewed publications and she holds a number of patents.

She co-authored a book with Lednicer and Mitscher. Her medical contributions include Gamendazole, Lonidamine and Pregnenolyne derivatives.

== Selected publications ==
- Hawkinson, J. E.; Sinville, R.; Mudaliar, D.; Shetty, J.; Ward, T.; Herr, J. C.; Georg, G. I. Potent Pyrimidine and Pyrrolopyrimidine Inhibitors of Testis-Specific Serine/Threonine Kinase 2 (TSSK2). ChemMedChem 2017. doi:10.1002/cmdc.201700503.
- Ayoub, A.; Hawk, M. L.; Herzig, R. J.; Wisniewski, A. J.; Gee, C. Zhu, J.-Y.; Berndt, N.; Scott, T. G.; Qi, J.; Jun, Q.; Bradner, J. E.; Ward, T. R.; Schönbrunn, E.; Georg, G. I.; Pomerantz, W. C. K. BET Bromodomain Inhibitors with One-step Synthesis Discovered from a Virtual Screen. J. Med. Chem. 2017, 60, 4805–4817.
- Syeda, S. S.; Carlson, E. J.; Miller, M. R.; Francis, R.; David E. Clapham, D. E.; Lishko, P. V.; Hawkinson, J. E.; Hook, D.; Georg, G. I. The Fungal Sexual Pheromone Sirenin Activates the Human CatSper Channel Complex. ACS Chem. Biol. 2016, 11, 452–459.
- Patil, S.; Lis, L. G.; Schumacher, R. J.; Norris, B. J.; Morgan, M. L.; Cuellar, R. A. D.; Blazar, B. R.; Suryanarayanan, R.; Gurvich, V. J.; Georg, G. I. Phosphonooxymethyl Prodrug of Triptolide: Synthesis, Physicochemical Characterization, and Efficacy in Human Colon adenocarcinoma and Ovarian Cancer. J. Med. Chem. 2015, 58, 9334–9344.
- Syeda, S. S.; Jakkaraj, S.; Georg, G. I. Scalable synthesis of the BET bromodomain inhibitor JQ1. Tetrahedron Lett. 2015, 56, 3454–3457.
- Coulup, S. K.; Huang, D. S.; Wong, H. L.; Georg, G. I. Identification of the Metabolic Profile of the α-Tubulin-binding Natural Product (-)-Pironetin. J. Med. Chem. 2019, 62, 1684–1689.
- Jakkaraj, S. R.; Young, V. G.; Georg, G. I. Syntheses of PDE3A Inhibitor ORG9935 and Determination of the Absolute Stereochemistries of its Enantiomers by X-ray Crystallography. Tetrahedron 2018, 74, 2769–2774.
- Miao, Z.; Guan, X.; Jiang, J.; Georg, G. I. BRDT Inhibitors for Male Contraceptive Drug Discovery: Current Status. In Targeting Protein-Protein Interactions by Small Molecules. Editors C. Sheng and G. I. Georg; Springer Nature Singapore; 2018, Chapter 11, pp 287–315.
- Paulson, C. N.; Guan, X.; Ayoub, A. M.; Chan, A.; Karim, R. M.; Pomerantz, W. K. C.; Schönbrunn, E.; Georg, G. I.; Hawkinson, J. E.Design, Synthesis and Characterization of a Pan-BET Fluorescent Polarization Bromodomain Probe. ACS Med. Chem. Lett. 2018, 9, 1223–12229.
