= Phenindamine =

Chemical compound

Clinical data
- AHFS/Drugs.com: Micromedex Detailed Consumer Information
- ATC code: R06AX04 (WHO)

Legal status
- Legal status: US: OTC

Identifiers
- IUPAC name: 2-methyl-9-phenyl-2,3,4,9-tetrahydro-1H-indeno[2,1-c]pyridine
- CAS Number: 82-88-2
- PubChem CID: 11291
- DrugBank: DB01619
- ChemSpider: 10817
- UNII: 772BQ8KSST
- KEGG: D08353
- ChEMBL: ChEMBL278398
- CompTox Dashboard (EPA): DTXSID0023452
- ECHA InfoCard: 100.001.313

Chemical and physical data
- Formula: C_{19}H_{19}N
- Molar mass: 261.368 g·mol^{−1}
- 3D model (JSmol): Interactive image
- SMILES: CN(C1)CCC2=C1C(C3=C2C=CC=C3)C4=CC=CC=C4
- InChI: InChI=1S/C19H19N/c1-20-12-11-16-15-9-5-6-10-17(15)19(18(16)13-20)14-7-3-2-4-8-14/h2-10,19H,11-13H2,1H3; Key:ISFHAYSTHMVOJR-UHFFFAOYSA-N

Phenindamine (Nolahist, Thephorin) is an antihistamine and anticholinergic closely related to cyproheptadine. It was developed by Hoffman-La Roche in the late 1940s. It is used to treat symptoms of the common cold and allergies, such as sneezing, itching, rashes, and hives. Its efficacy against some symptoms of opioid withdrawal was researched in the 1950s and 1960s in a number of countries; William S. Burroughs' book Junkie mentions this technique. Like many other first-generation antihistamines, phenindamine has useful potentiating effects on many narcotic analgesics and is even more useful with those opioids which release histamine when in the body.

Nolahist was originally manufactured in the US by Carnrick Laboratories, and later by Amarin Pharmaceuticals. When that company ceased its American operations, its product line was acquired by Valeant, but they declined to resume manufacturing Nolahist. The last produced lot bore an expiration date of 10/2005, and the product is no longer available.

Phenindamine does exhibit optical isomerism as do other chemicals of its general type ranging from pethidine and alphaprodine to cyproheptadine.

== See also ==
- Cyproheptadine
