= Riccardo Polosa =

Italian academic

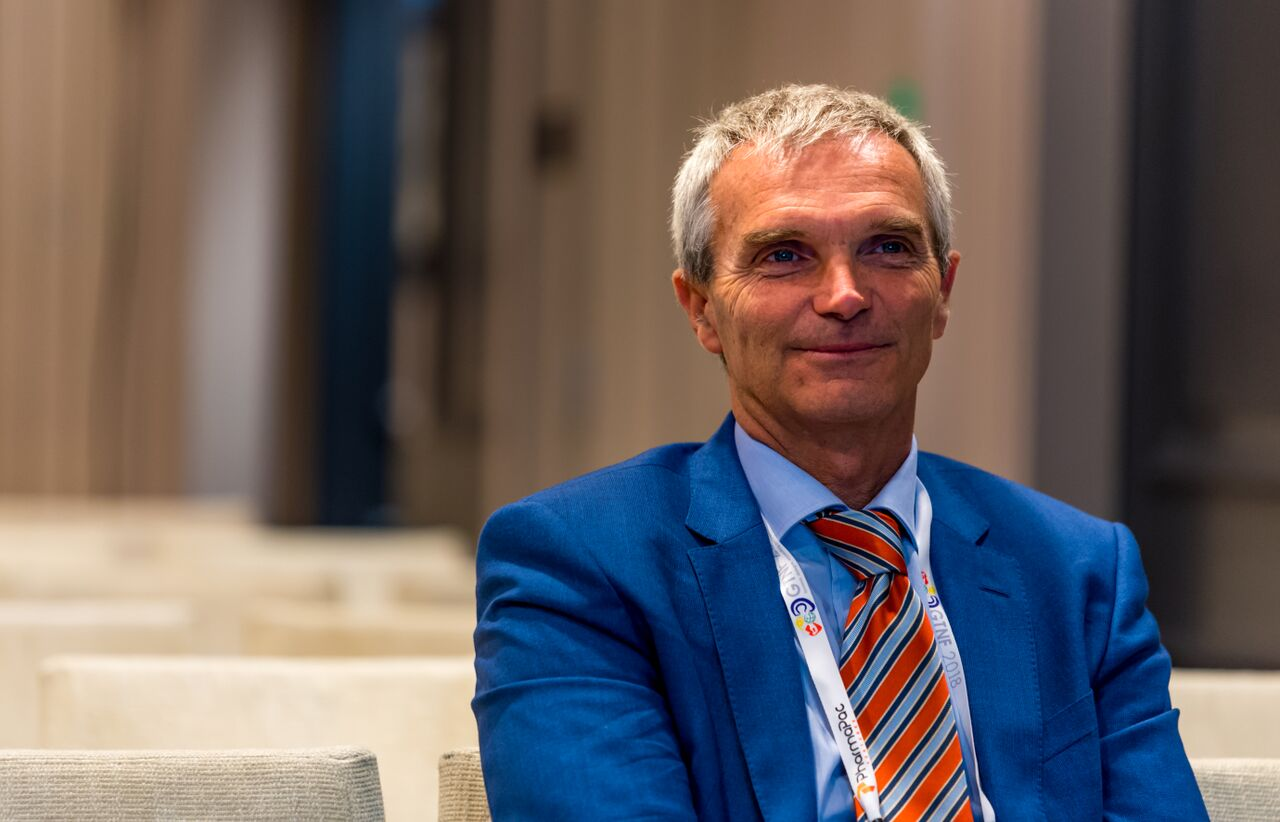
Prof. Riccardo Polosa, Founder of CoEHAR

Riccardo Polosa (born in July 1961 in Catania) is an Italian respiratory physician. According to a paper published in BMC Public Health, he is the most prolific author in the field of electronic cigarettes, as of 2014. "Full Professor of Internal Medicine and specialist of Respiratory Diseases and Clinical Immunology at the University of Catania as well as the Founder and Clinical Director of the Center for Tobacco Research and Scientific Director of the Center of Excellence for the acceleration of Harm Reduction (CoEHAR) at the same University." His research interests center on asthma, COPD, respiratory diseases, smoking-related diseases, smoking prevention and cessation, tobacco harm reduction, and new tobacco products. Since 2009, his research team has been involved in studies on the impact of e-cigarettes, and they were the first in the world to publish a randomized controlled trial on e-cigarettes.

The focus of his academic research has been historically centered upon the investigation of mechanisms of inflammation, biomarkers of disease activity, and novel drug target discovery in the area of respiratory medicine (asthma, COPD, rhinitis) and clinical immunology (allergic and autoimmune diseases). This has culminated with the participation of his research group in large EU funded Pan-European research consortia (Unbiased BIOmarkers for the PREDiction of Respiratory Disease Outcome -U-BIOPRED; Airway Disease Predicting Outcomes through Patient Specific Computational Modelling – AIRPROM; Integral Rheumatology & Immunology Specialists Network – IRIS).

== Research on asthma, COPD, and respiratory diseases ==
Polosa Riccardo received his bachelor's degree in medicine and surgery from University of Catania in 1986. He thereafter pursued specialisations in diseases of the respiratory system and tisiology in 1990 from the same university and clinical immunology and allergology in 1994 from University of Southampton. He returned to university of Catania to pursue PhD in internal medicine.

Riccardo Polosa pursued specializations in diseases of the respiratory system and physiology in 1990 from the University of Catania and clinical immunology and allergology in 1994 from the University of Southampton. In 1996 he pursued Ph.D. in Internal Medicine at the University of Florence with a thesis on "The role of adhesion molecules in the inflammatory response of allergic asthma" (Supervisor: Prof. L. Mughini). Since 2002 Polosa is a reviewer of the Italian Ministry of Health for ECM activities in the field of Respiratory Diseases and Clinical Immunology and Allergology.

His scientific interests concern: the pathogenetic mechanisms and treatment of asthma, COPD, and rhinitis. Environmental health problems include the incidence of allergic and respiratory diseases in urban areas and air pollution. Significant risk factors for new-onset asthma and progression of COPD.

== Social and Scientific contribution to Harm Reduction ==
In 2000, Polosa Riccardo was appointed Professor in University of Eastern Piedmont, while he continued to serve in various capacities at the department of Pneumology, Rheumatology, Immunological Diseases and Allergology and the center for Prevention and Treatment of Tobacco Smoking at University of Catania. Polosa was appointed full professor of internal medicine at University of Catania in 2007 and was promoted as the director of the School of Specialization in Rheumatology in 2011.

In 2018, Riccardo Polosa founded the Center of Excellence for the acceleration of Harm Reduction (CoEHAR), University of Catania, Italy.

The CoEHAR aims at developing policy recommendations that would allow a more widespread diffusion of 'reduced-risk products', such as electronic cigarettes.

Riccardo Polosa was the principal investigator the first prospective randomized study with control group evaluating the efficacy and safety of electronic cigarettes on a sample of 300 smokers unwilling to quit.

He serves as an external member of the Technical Committee of the Italian Institute of Health (ISS). He is also the National Coordinator for the Italian Working Group on "Electronic cigarettes and e-liquids" and has been recently elected Convener for the Working Group on "Requirements and test methods for emissions of electronic cigarettes", within the European Committee for Standardization.

In May 2020, he launched the Catania Conversation, a science communication initiative that seeks to bring the best of science and media to the high table where policy decisions are debated and decided.

He specialized in the field of tobacco smoking, tobacco harm reduction, and electronic cigarettes. His work contributed to a 2015 paper that found that "e-cigarettes were 95% less harmful than tobacco cigarettes". This finding has been criticized by The Lancet. He also challenged claims that vaping poses a risk during the COVID-19 pandemic.

=== Research projects and scientific contributions on diabetes, smoking, and digital health (Quit smoking app) ===
As CoEHAR founder and scientific director, Polosa invests in scientific and technological innovation to promote and evaluate effective and less harmful solutions than combustible smoking. He has led research projects which, through the development of apps, provide daily support for diabetic patients to quit smoking, such as the Diasmoke Project.

DIASMOKE (Assessing the impact of combustion free-nicotine delivery technologies in Diabetic Smokers) is an international, multicenter, open-label randomized controlled study designed to determine whether diabetic smokers switching to combustion-free nicotine delivery systems (C-F NDS) experience measurable improvement in cardiovascular risk parameters as a consequence of avoiding exposure to cigarette smoke toxicants.

This study aims to test the hypothesis that avoiding exposure to cigarette smoke toxicants may translate to measurable improvement in cardiovascular risk factors and functional parameters when type 2 diabetes mellitus patients who smoke switch to alternative products compared with diabetic patients who continue to smoke conventional tobacco products.

=== Smoking and Covid-19 ===
Riccardo Polosa has recently conducted studies on the relationship between cigarette smoking, contagion, and disease caused by the virus. Among the most important papers, he published: COVID-19 and Obesity: Dangerous Liaisons; Seroepidemiological Survey on the Impact of Smoking on SARS-CoV-2 Infection and COVID-19 Outcomes: Protocol for the Troina Study; The effect of laboratory-verified smoking on SARS-CoV-2 infection: results from the Troina seroepidemiological survey; Smoking and SARS-CoV-2 Disease (COVID-19); Analytic modeling and risk assessment of aerial transmission of SARS-CoV-2 virus through vaping expirations in shared micro-environments

== Publications ==
Riccardo Polosa is the author of over 411 scientific publications most of which are articles published in extenso in international scientific journals (H index equal to 56 –Citation Index total equal to 12104 - source: Scopus). For the complete list of all publications, refer to PubMed and EMBASE databases

In addition, Polosa is also author of over 30 chapters on national and international volumes and is the Chief Editor of two international volumes published in 2007 and one in 2009. He is also among the curators of the Italian edition of AA.VV. Macleod - Manuale di semeiotica e metodologia medica, Edra Elsevier, Milan 2014.

== Other relevant activities ==
Polosa has held several public positions, he was secretary and then chair of the "Airway Regulation, Provocation and Monitoring" Group of the European Respiratory Society, Chair for the "Diagnosis and Therapeutics Committee" of the American Academy of Allergy Asthma and Immunology, and Founder of the University Center of Excellence for the acceleration of Harm Reduction (CoEHAR).

Riccardo Polosa collaborates as a reviewer of the Italian Ministry of Health for ECM activities in the field of Respiratory Diseases and the field Clinical Immunology and Allergology. He is Coordinator of the UNI Working Group on " Electronic cigarettes and e-liquids” and convenor of the CEN European Working Group on " Requirements and test methods for emissions of electronic cigarettes. Riccardo Polosa is Coordinator of the Italian Working Group UNI/CT 042/GL 67 "Electronic cigarettes and e- liquids" and Convenor of the European Working Group 4 "Requirements and test methods for emissions of electronic cigarettes", (CEN/TC 437). Polosa is also a member of the Technical Committee of the Italian Institute of Health on monitoring electronic cigarettes.

Polosa is Associate Editor for Internal and Emergency Medicine, Therapeutic Advances in Chronic Disease, International Journal of Environmental Research and Public Health.
