= Physical pharmacy =

Subdiscipline of pharmacy dealing with applications of physics and chemistry

Physical pharmacy is the branch of pharmacy that concentrates on the applications of physics and chemistry to the study of pharmacy. In other words, it is the study of the effects that dosage forms have on their environment by addressing issues at the molecular level. It emphasis on the physical characteristics and actions of the drug delivery system before the same is given to the patient. It forms the basis for design, manufacture, and distribution of drug products and serves as the foundation for the stable and proper use of medical drugs. It covers areas such as solubility, pharmacokinetics and drug delivery.

Physical pharmacy serves as principles that guide the pharmaceutical developments. It also serves as a basis for the understanding of drug absorptions, distributions, metabolism, and eliminations that happen during the course of drug treatment.

== Practice areas ==
Physical pharmacy deals with the science that works on the following aspects which are related to the development of a drug product.

- Uniformity and precision in dosage for each dosage form.
- Results of therapeutic effects during the course of the treatment.
- Physical stability and appeal of the drug.
- Labeling of storage conditions and expiration dates.
