= Juul =

American electronic cigarette manufacturer

Juul Labs, Inc.

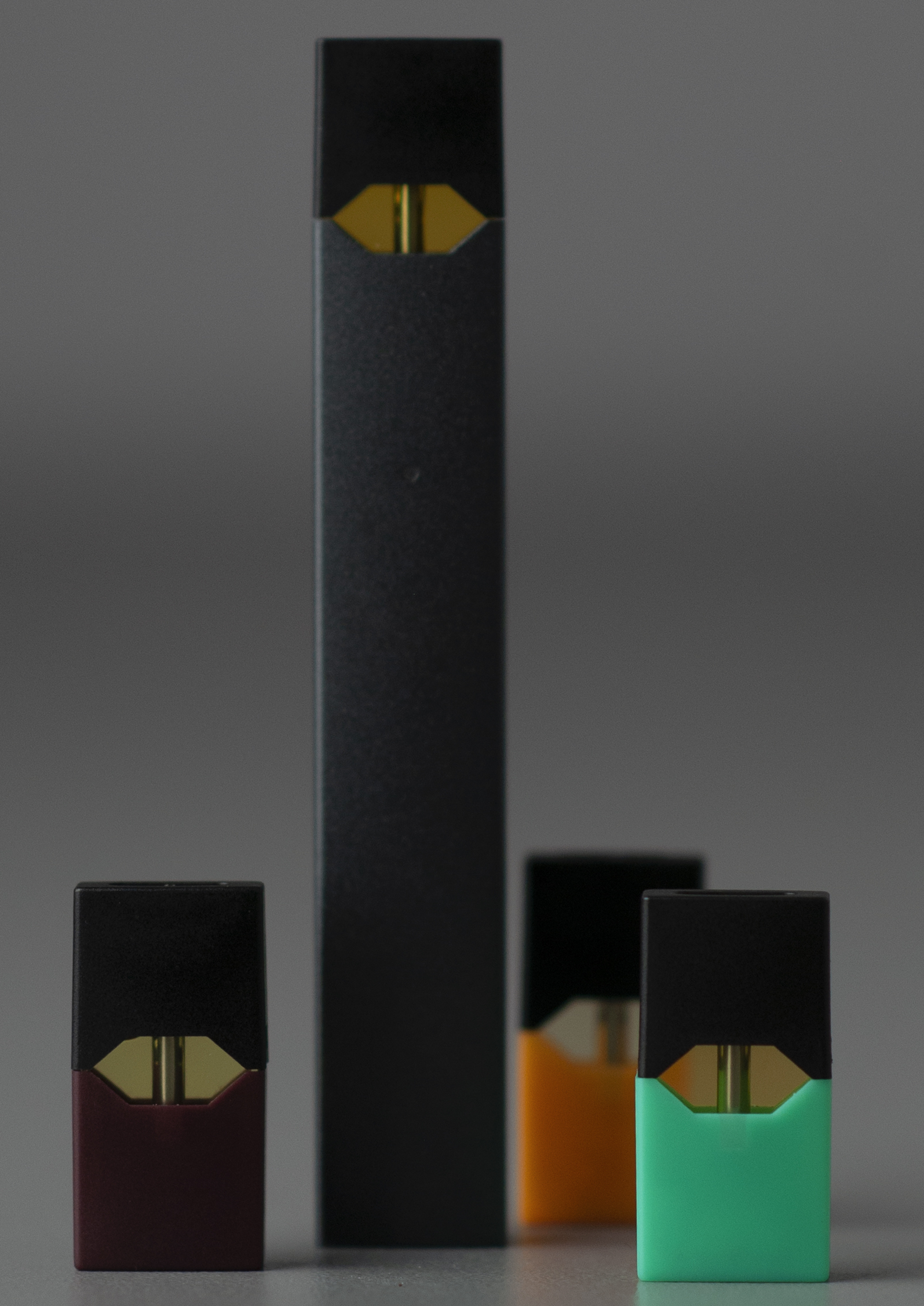
- Juul vaping device alongside Mango pod (orange), Mint pod (light green), and Virginia Tobacco (dark brown)
- Type: Private
- Industry: Electronic cigarettes
- Predecessor: Pax Labs
- Founded: May 22, 2015; 11 years ago
- Founders: James Monsees; Adam Bowen
- Headquarters: San Francisco, United States
- Area served: Worldwide: United States; Canada; Italy; Kuwait; Russia; South Korea; Southeast Asia; United Kingdom
- Key people: KC Crosthwaite (CEO); James Monsees (CPO); Adam Bowen (CTO)
- Products: Electronic cigarettes
- Revenue: $2 billion (2018)
- Owner: Altria (35%)
- Number of employees: 1,500 (2018)
- Website: juul.com

Juul Labs, Inc. (/ˈdʒuːl/, stylized as JUUL Labs) is an American electronic cigarette company headquartered in San Francisco. Its flagship product is the Juul electronic cigarette, which atomizes nicotine salts derived from tobacco supplied by one-time use cartridges. Juul Labs was co-founded by Adam Bowen and James Monsees as part of Pax Labs and started selling the Juul device in 2015. In 2017, Juul Labs was spun off from Pax Labs, after which Altria acquired a 35% stake in the company for $12.8 billion on December 20, 2018. Juul received a $2 billion bonus to distribute among its 1,500 employees.

After a large social media marketing campaign, Juul became the most popular e-cigarette in the United States by the end of 2017 and had a market share of 72% as of September 2018. Juul also purchased ad space in Seventeen magazine, and on the Nick Jr. Channel TV network. According to documents obtained by the Massachusetts Attorney General's office, Juul bought ads on seventeen different educational, gaming, and crafting sites directed towards middle and high school students. Its widespread use by young people triggered concern from the public health community and multiple investigations by the U.S. Food and Drug Administration (FDA), and the high nicotine concentrations in Juul was seen as a potential health hazard to young people. Juul agreed to pull certain flavored cartridges, which could entice underage use, from the market in 2018, and a year later reached a settlement with the Center for Environmental Health to scale back and restrict its marketing efforts to those who are appropriately aged.

By July 2020, Juul's market share was 42% and as of September 2022, it was 28%. A 2022 survey found that Juul is the third most popular e-cigarette brand among middle-school and high-school students, used by 22% of e-cigarette users. On June 23, 2022, the FDA denied authorization for Juul to continue selling its products in the United States, and issued Marketing Denial Orders banning any further marketing or sale of the products effective immediately. That order was blocked by the U.S. Court of Appeals for Washington, D.C. the next day. In July 2025, the FDA authorized Juul to sell tobacco- and menthol-flavored vapes only.

== History ==
=== Early history ===
In 2005, two former cigarette smokers, Adam Bowen and James Monsees, met while they were graduate students in product-design at Stanford University and developed an e-cigarette called Ploom. By 2007, they started a business with the same name. In 2015, the company sold Ploom, changed their name to Pax Labs, and developed Juul. Juul Labs, Inc. was founded on May 22, 2015. The Juul electronic cigarette was introduced by Pax Labs in June 2015.

In July 2017, Juul Labs was spun out of PAX Labs as an independent company, with Tyler Goldman, former CEO of PAX Labs, named as CEO of Juul after the spin-off. In December 2017, Goldman was replaced by Kevin Burns. Co-founder James Monsees worked as Chief Product Officer and board member at Juul. Co-founder Adam Bowen worked as Chief Technology Officer and board member at Juul. Other board members include Nicholas Pritzker, whose family owned chewing tobacco giant Conwood, Riaz Valani, and Hoyoung Huh.

=== 2017–2019 ===
The company grew from 200 employees in September 2017 to 1,500 by the end of 2018. As of July 2018, the Juul e-cigarette is manufactured in Shenzhen, China while the pods are made in the United States. Pods are also referred to as "vape juice."

In July 2018, Juul raised $650 million, giving it a valuation of $15 billion. On December 20, 2018, Altria, one of the world's largest cigarette manufacturers, bought 35% of Juul for $12.8 billion. According to Wells Fargo, the deal valued Juul Labs at $38 billion. At the time, Juul had an annual revenue of about $2 billion. Juul bought a building in San Francisco in 2019 for almost $400 million.

In April 2018, former Massachusetts Attorney General Martha Coakley joined Juul, working in the government affairs team to coordinate lobbying for the product, while advocating against underage usage. Ethical questions have been raised about Coakley's lobbying for the industry considering her former position as attorney general and the accusations of Juul marketing to youth.

In October 2018 Juul Labs, Inc. purchased VMR Products LLC, the parent company of V2 e-cigarettes in a $75 million deal. VMR Products LLC was an electronic cigarette company that marketed brands of e-cigarettes and vaporizers, including V2, V2 Pro, Vapor Couture and Vapour2. A few years prior to the acquisition, VMR was described as "the market leader in online sales of e-cigs". It was reported that Juul's rationale for the acquisition of VMR products was to gain access to the Chinese market. VMR Products was owned at the time by Huabao International Holdings.

On June 13, 2019, United States House of Representatives launched an investigation into the Juul Labs, looking into the business deal with Altria, social media and advertising practices, and communications. The investigation was spearheaded by Illinois Representative Raja Krishnamoorthi, chairman of the Oversight Subcommittee on Economic and Consumer Policy. The subcommittee found that "Juul appears to be violating FDA regulations against making unapproved express and implied claims that its product helps users stop smoking cigarettes and is safer than cigarettes".

On September 25, 2019, it was announced that Kevin Burns was stepping down as CEO and K.C. Crosthwaite, the Chief Growth Officer for Altria, would be taking over the role. In October 2019, it was reported that Juul planned to lay off approximately 500 workers by the end of 2019. In October 2019, a number of executives departed the company including Chief Financial Officer Tim Danaher, Chief Administrative Officer Ashley Gould, Chief Marketing Officer Craig Brommers, and Senior Vice President of advanced technologies David Foster.

On October 31, 2019, Altria announced that it was writing down $4.5 billion of the investment it had made in Juul. Altria cut Juul's valuation to approximately $10 billion in October 2020, $4.3 billion by March 2021, $1.6 billion by March 2022, and $450 million in July 2022 (3.5% of the original valuation).

=== 2020–present ===
On January 25, 2020, it was announced that Grant Winterton, president of operations in Europe, Middle East and Africa, and Ken Bishop, president of operations in Asia-Pacific South, were both leaving Juul as it sought to cut $1 billion in costs. Winterton was reported to have organized expensive events paid for by the company.

In 2021, journalist Jamie Ducharme released a book about the history of the company entitled Big Vape: The Incendiary Rise of Juul. It was adapted into a Netflix series in 2023.

In March 2023, Altria announced that they would exchange their minority ownership of Juul for licensing rights to some of the company's intellectual property.

In April 2023, Juul agreed to pay out $462 million to the states of New York, California, Colorado, Illinois, Massachusetts, New Mexico and the District of Columbia to settle a lawsuit alleging that the company marketed their products to children. This and payouts from other similar lawsuits have cost the company at least $3 billion.

In 2025, Juul launched the Juul2, a new device with Bluetooth capability and an optional app that requires age verification. The company says it is designed solely to help existing adult smokers to quit.

== Corporate affairs ==
=== Executive team ===
K. C. Crosthwaite has been CEO of Juul since 2019. Adam Bowen is the founder and Chief Technology Officer and James Monsees founder and Chief Product Officer. In March 2020, it was reported that Monsees was planning to step down from his role at the company. He would also be stepping down as an adviser and board member.

Jose Luis Murillo is the Chief Regulatory Officer of Juul. His previous position was Senior Vice President, Regulatory Affairs at Altria.

=== Investors ===
Current company investors include Tiger Global Management, mutual fund firm Fidelity Investments, and Tao Capital. In June 2018, Juul reportedly raised $1.2 billion in a financing round that valued the company at more than $16 billion. Around the same time TPG Capital declined to invest in Juul due to ethical concerns.

Altria Group (formerly Philip Morris Companies), acquired a 35% stake in Juul Labs for $12.8 billion on December 20, 2018. Altria is the largest tobacco company in the United States. According to a Wall Street Journal report, Altria's investment in Juul was pushed by the fact that many smokers were switching to the electronic variant and Altria's own e-cigarette product, MarkTen, was not selling well. Critics have cited the acquisition as proof that the vaping industry and "Big Tobacco," the latter of which long denied the link between smoking and health complications, are increasingly one and the same. Shortly after the deal, which also allowed Juul to be sold in more places, then FDA Commissioner Scott Gottlieb called out the combined company for "deviating from the representation that they already made to the agency about steps they are taking to restrict their products in a way that will decrease access to kids."

== Design ==
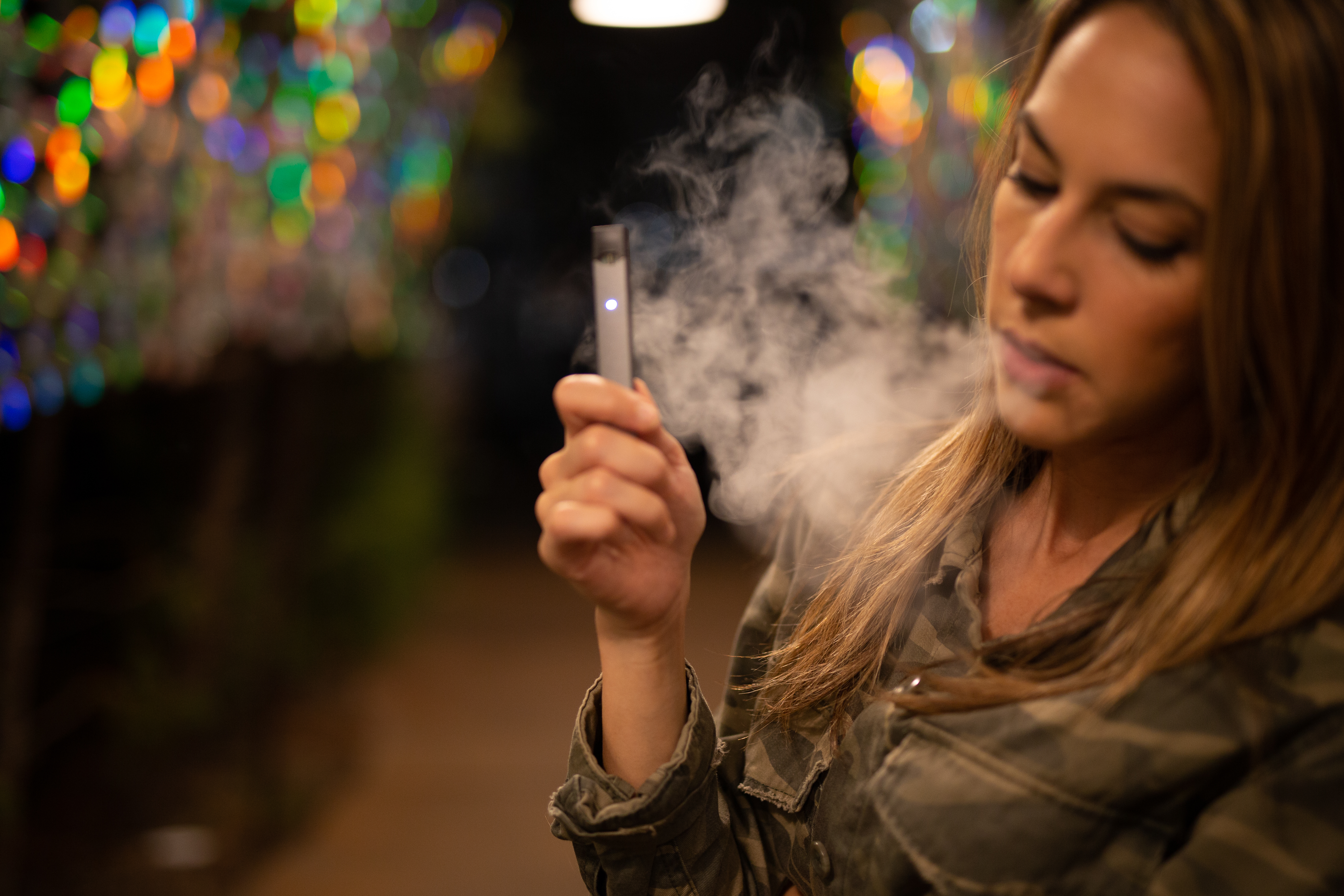
A person using a Juul device

The Juul e-cigarette looks similar to a USB flash drive, and it is recharged using a magnetic USB dock.

Juul e-cigarettes use nicotine salts (protonated nicotine) rather than free-base nicotine as used in most previous generations of e-cigarettes. The nicotine is derived from tobacco. Juul received a US patent for its nicotine salt preparation in 2015. The nicotine salts are said to create an experience more like smoking than other e-cigarettes on the market, as Juul attempts to deliver a nicotine peak in five minutes, similar to a traditional cigarette.

The nicotine salts reduce the harshness of the Juul aerosol as compared to tobacco smoke. The protonated nicotine formulation of nicotine salts has been described as problematic because it seemingly allow users to inhale much higher nicotine concentrations than they would otherwise be able to. Each cartridge (called a Juul pod or "JUULpod") contains about the same amount of nicotine as one pack of cigarettes and delivers approximately 200 puffs.

The amount of nicotine in each cartridge – 59 mg/ml in the United States, limited to 20 mg/ml in the European Union – is substantially more than the majority of e-cigarettes on the market. In August 2018, Juul introduced pods in 3 percent strengths for its mint and Virginia tobacco flavors. This is equivalent to 30 mg/ml. Each cartridge contains propylene glycol, glycerin, flavorings, and nicotine salts. Juul pods came in eight flavors until late 2019, of which mango was the most popular. A Juul starter kit sells for about $50.

Joel Johnson of Co.Design described the nicotine intake as "eye-widening" and its aesthetics as "demure". Upon initial release, Ben Radding of Men's Fitness called Juul the "iPhone of E-cigs." The comparison to the iPhone and other Apple products has been made by many other commentators. Pharmacologist James Pauly, a specialist in nicotine, notes that Juul delivers more nicotine than other e-cigarettes, and that the salts also may reduce the harshness, making it easier for new smokers, such as teenagers, to consume more nicotine than they are aware of.

In August 2019, a spokesperson for Juul Labs said that the company was exploring an option similar to the deposit system for Juul pods to reduce marine pollution (which was proposed by Yogi Hale Hendlin, Postdoctoral Research Fellow in the Department of Medicine at the University of California, San Francisco). The spokesperson mentioned in an email that the company is committed to responsible stewardship and environmental sustainability.

== Usage ==
=== Prevalence among adolescents ===
Juul's products have become immensely popular among teenagers, raising concerns among the public health community that long-term declines in youth nicotine use are being reversed. An October 2018 study of 13,000 Americans found that 9.5% of teenagers aged 15–17 and 11% of young adults aged 18–21 currently use Juul, and that teenagers age 15–17 are 16 times more likely to be Juul users than 25–34 year olds. Juul use is also very popular among middle school and high school students; with one in five students between the ages of 12 and 17 having seen a Juul used in school. Teenagers use the verb "Juuling" to describe their use of Juul.

The National Drug Trends of 2018 revealed increasing adolescent use of e-cigarettes, including the Juul. Cigarette smoking rates among 12th graders continued to decline as it has been for two decades. On the other hand, the increase in vaping rates from 2017 to 2018 was the largest gap recorded since the study began in 1975. Researchers hypothesize this may be due to the number of educational programs implemented to warn youth of the risks of cigarette smoking, while there is still a lack of programs regarding vaping devices. The percentage of 12th grade students who reported vaping nicotine almost doubled, from 11% in 2017 to 21% in 2018. Among 10th graders, the percentage doubled from 8% to 16%.

A Truth Initiative study found that of 15 to 17-year-olds who use Juul, 56% used the device more than three times a month. Over 25% of teenagers reported using the Juul more than ten times a month. These findings suggest that teenagers are not just experimenting with Juuls, but rather using them on a regular basis. This was in apparent contrast to Juul founders James Monsees' and Adam Bowen's claim that the mission of the Juul is to improve adult smokers' lives by eliminating cigarettes.

Many reasons have been proposed for Juul's popularity among teenagers, including adolescents' misperception that Juul is safe, ease of concealment, sleek high-tech design, and fruity pod flavors. Advertising aimed directly at teens, may also have played a role. In February 2020, the Massachusetts Attorney General's office revealed that evidence it obtained during its investigation documented that the company bought ad space on Seventeen magazine, Nickelodeon and Nick Jr, and on seventeen homework and game sites for middle and high school students, including CoolMathGames.com and dailydressupgames.com.

A 2015 Stanford University study analyzing adolescents' perceptions of risks and benefits of conventional cigarettes and e-cigarettes found that some of the participants believed that e-cigarettes did not contain nicotine, only water vapor. Additionally, the 2017 Truth Initiative survey found 63% of teens and young adults did not understand that the Juul products they used always contains nicotine. A lack of educational programs and public health campaigns regarding the use of e-cigarettes and Juuls reflect how teenagers may perceive these devices as many of the risks are still unknown. Former PAX Labs CEO Goldman said to Fortune in 2016 that "Juul should not be used by those under the legal age, nor should any nicotine products, as stated by the U.S. Surgeon General." In 2018 Matt Myers, president of Campaign for Tobacco-Free Kids, said the design "misleads about risk" of addiction.

Juul's resemblance to a flash drive and very compact size makes it easy to conceal, and its low vapor output and subtle scent, which can be passed off as perfume, mean that it can be used discreetly, even in class. Accordingly, it is easy to conceal in clothing or elsewhere; a high school in Newton, Massachusetts discovered a Juul disguised as a Sharpie, for instance. Juul's iPhone-reminiscent design, as well as its compact and high-tech design, are other commonly cited reasons for its rising popularity among young people.

Juul's sweet flavors, especially the fruit and crème brûlée ones, are especially attractive to teenagers, according to journalists, academics, and the U.S. Food and Drug Administration. Unlike cigarette smoke's smell, Juuls can emit a fruity scent when vaped. In a 2016 study by the CDC and FDA, 31% of middle and high school students who use e-cigarettes claimed they used them due to the availability of flavors. In response, Juul renamed some flavors—"cool cucumber" to "cucumber", "crème brûlée" to "creme", and "classic menthol" to "menthol"—saying that it "heard the criticism" and "responded by simplifying the names and losing the descriptors." In November 2018, Juul discontinued all flavored pods to prevent the increase in teen usage.

Many of Juul's early marketing campaigns were youth-oriented, with prominent use of social media, youth-friendly themes, and young models pictured using Juuls. In July 2019, Juul spent thousands of dollars to promote Juul as a smoking cessation to kids in schools. Juul made false claims about it being "completely safe" and presented opportunities for teens to become influencers for the company. In response to the FDA crackdown on Juul, the company announced they would be using real customers who were using the product to switch from smoking instead of models. As of November 2018, Juul has shut down their social media accounts.

A May 2018 Truth Initiative survey found that 74% of Juul users ages 12–17 obtained their Juul device from a brick and mortar store, 52% from a friend or family member, and 6% online (respondents could select multiple answers). Juul estimates that 90% of its sales are in brick and mortar stores. The survey also found that 89% of youth attempts to buy a Juul online succeeded. However, Juul changed its age-verification policies in October 2018 in response to FDA pressure, with employees manually checking drivers licenses against public records for exact matches, rejecting anyone under 21 but also rejecting or deterring many adults.

== Health concerns ==
In a documentary for CNBC, Burns said that the effect of vaping on Juul users, including minors, is unknown. Burns told Carl Quintanilla, "Frankly, we don't know today. We have not done the long-term, longitudinal clinical testing that we need to do." In sampling multiple e-cigarette delivery systems, a 2019 study found Juul pods were the only product to demonstrate in vitro cytotoxicity from both nicotine and flavor chemical content, in particular ethyl maltol. Vape liquid pods may contain numerous other compounds and are known to provide unreliable nicotine delivery that is often inconsistent with the labeling.

These liquid pods also contain propylene glycol, which has been shown to induce airway epithelial injury and deep airway inflammation. Due to a story about the vaped-induced lung disease in the US, an upsurge of people began tweeting about giving up Juuling within a 24-hour period.

=== Nicotine content ===
One Juul pod contains the same amount of nicotine as one to two packs of cigarettes. The nicotine content of Juuls is higher than other e-cigarette brands with its volume of e-liquid containing 5% nicotine, almost double the amount of other brands. Juul pods also contain a substantially greater amount of benzoic acid, 44.8 mg/mL, as compared to other brands, which contain around 0.2 to 2 mg/mL. Constant exposure to benzoic acid can lead to coughing, sore throat, and abdominal pain. "When Juul came out with very high-nicotine electronic cigarettes, it triggered a nicotine arms race amongst competitive companies seeking to emulate the success of Juul," Robert Jackler, head of Stanford Research into the Impact of Tobacco Advertising, stated in 2019. In certain markets such as Israel the maximum legal limit is 1.7% for the amount of nicotine allowed in its pods, but in the US Juul does not offer 1.7%. Juul does not offer low-dose or no-dose nicotine pods.

Juuls are unique from other e-cigarettes in that they use nicotine salts rather than freebase nicotine in order to reproduce the effects of conventional cigarettes. Nicotine salts are also less acidic than freebase nicotine, making them easier to inhale. Additionally, nicotine salts are more readily absorbed into the bloodstream at a rate similar to conventional cigarettes. Due to its lack of irritation and easiness to inhale, users may be unaware of how much nicotine they are actually intaking. Given the high nicotine concentrations in Juul, the nicotine-related health consequences of its use by young people could be more severe than those from their use of other e-cigarette products.

Ari Atkins, Pax Labs' R&D engineer, said "We don't think a lot about addiction here because we're not trying to design a cessation product at all." He added, "anything about health is not on our mind." In April 2018, FDA Commissioner Dr. Scott Gottlieb stated that the nicotine in Juul is sufficient to result in addiction. Gottlieb further stated, "In some cases, our kids are trying these products and liking them without even knowing they contain nicotine. And that's a problem, because as we know the nicotine in these products can rewire an adolescent's brain, leading to years of addiction."

In late 2018, news reports noted increasing rates of Juul addiction in teenagers, which negatively impacts brain development and relationships. Juul's high nicotine content has attracted concern because of nicotine's addictive properties. Particular concern has been expressed about the lack of vaping cessation treatments for adolescents, and the FDA scheduled a public hearing on youth vaping cessation for January 18, 2019.

=== Research misconduct ===
In 2018, Juul paid cardiologist Konstantinos Farsalinos 7000 € to attend a meeting with the Israeli health ministry as an independent researcher.

In 2021, Juul paid $51,000 to devote the entire May/June issue American Journal of Health Behavior to publishing 11 studies that it funded to show its products helped smokers quit. While all papers have been peer-reviewed (with a 12th paper being rejected), the legitimacy of the process has been discussed by academics. The American Prospect described this move as "taking academic corruption to a new level". A 2021 study in Tobacco Control found that less than half of clinical trials sponsored by Juul were properly reported.

== Markets and market share ==
=== United States ===
Sales of Juul increased 700% in 2016. Juul accounted for over 70% of the US e-cigarette market in 2018 as monitored by Nielsen, but Juul's market share fell to 42% by July 2020, and further to 36% by March 2022. Its falling share during 2019 was picked up by rivals Blu, NJOY, Vuse and Logic, according to Wells Fargo analyst Bonnie Herzog.

According to Dow Jones VentureSource, Juul Labs was the sixth-most valuable US startup in July 2018, behind Uber and Airbnb. Juul's revenue in 2018 was $1 billion, up from approximately $245 million in 2017. Juul's success has inspired a number of imitators, namely pod-mod devices with similar boxy designs. These devices come from companies ranging from startups to "Big Tobacco" company R.J. Reynolds.

=== International ===
In May 2018, Juul started selling in Israel, which did not regulate e-cigarettes at the time. Israel later banned Juul's products in August 2018, citing public health concerns, according to a statement by the Ministry of Health. Prime Minister Benjamin Netanyahu, acting in his capacity as Health Minister, placed a complete ban on Juul because it delivers nearly three times Israel's recommended amount of 20 mg/ml of nicotine. Juul has appealed the ban to Israel's High Court of Justice.

In July 2018, Juul announced it would launch in the United Kingdom. Flavours sold in the UK have slightly different names from the American versions and are available in strengths of 9 mg/ml and 18 mg/ml (lower strengths than in the US in order to comply with UK regulations). It was noted that the UK was chosen as an early launch market as it had the world's most supportive government when it came to encouraging smokers to vape.

In August 2018, Juul introduced its products in Canada, starting with an online launch before introducing them to vape shops, gas stations, and convenience stores in early September. Juul launched in Russia in late-2018 and launched in South Korea and Ireland in May 2019. Juul launched in Ukraine in June 2019. In June 2019, they announced plans for their products to be available in the Philippine market. At the beginning of 2019, Juul started selling products containing 1.7% nicotine in Germany.

In January 2019, Juul announced plans for a launch in India. In response, the Ministry of Health and Family Welfare called for the device to be banned from India, citing concerns that it could derail the government's anti-tobacco programs. The regulation of e-cigarettes in India is disputed between the government and the judiciary. Six states have banned their use, though the Delhi High Court has stayed the bans. As such, Juul e-cigarettes are not legally available in India and they are commonly sold on the gray market for as much as $100 for the starter kit that costs $29 in the United States.

Due to low overall sales in the Europe and Middle East market, Juul announced in May 2020 that it will exit the market in Austria, Belgium, Portugal, France, and Spain. Following a series of layoffs at Juul's German subsidiary, the company also stopped selling in Germany, and in November 2020 announced it will also exit Ireland. In July 2021, Juul stopped selling in Ukraine in protest to changes in tax regarding e-liquids, therefore making e-cigarettes subject to hefty taxes like tobacco products. Within Europe, Juul maintains a presence in the UK (where it is the second most popular cartridge-based e-cigarette brand behind Vuse with a share of 23% in 2023) and in Italy.

== Marketing ==
Juul has been intensively marketed via Instagram and other social media. Of the $2.2 million Juul spent on marketing in 2015 and 2016, $1 million went to online marketing, according to data from Kantar Media. Juul's heavy reliance on social media marketing is unique among major e-cigarette brands in the US—Blu and NJOY were initially promoted mainly with television advertising while Vuse and MarkTen relied on promotional expenditures to consumers and retailers—and is touted as a major reason for its success. Juul's use of social media marketing is also relatively inexpensive: to promote Vuse, its owner R.J. Reynolds Vapor Company spent over $16 million on television ads alone in 2015 and 2016, according to Kantar data. A 2018 study found that "Juul's social media activities were highly correlated with Juul retail sales."

Juul's marketing has been criticized for targeting youth. The themes emphasized in Juul's marketing, especially freedom, relaxation, and sex appeal; the use of young models and imagery claimed to be appealing to young people; and the use of social media influencers and affiliates popular among youth are three reasons why many consider Juul's marketing to be targeting youth.

In 2015, John Schachter, director of state communications for the Campaign for Tobacco-Free Kids, voiced concern regarding the youth of men and women portrayed in Juul's advertising, particularly in combination with the design, stating that "We're seeing more and more irresponsible marketing of unregulated products such as e-cigarettes." Similarly, the campaign's vice-president of communications Wilmore stated that Juul Labs "used the same imagery and themes that tobacco companies have always used to appeal to kids, and they fueled it with social media." A student testified at a Congressional hearing in 2019 that a Juul spokesperson purportedly told high school students that its products are "totally safe".

Juul Labs argues that its marketing is targeted at adult cigarette smokers who are looking to quit. The rectangular design of the Juul e-cigarette, for example, was chosen to avoid reminding smokers of a cigarette, according to a Juul executive. However, in February 2020, the Massachusetts Attorney General's office revealed that evidence it obtained during its investigation documented that the company bought ad space on Seventeen magazine, Nickelodeon and the Nick Jr. Channel, and on 15 homework and game sites for middle school and high school students, including CoolMathGames.com.

In September 2018, Juul implemented a new marketing code to avoid the appearance of targeting youth. Changes brought about by the new code include only showcasing former smokers age 35 or older in ads, no longer featuring models on social media, removing social media accounts that marketed online, and adding the label "the alternative for adult smokers" to its packaging and many of its ads. Juul took down all of its social media accounts that November. A study by PLOS One and funded by Truth Initiative found that Juul's actions against youth-targeted social media posts were followed by a decrease in new Juul-related posts on Instagram for two months, beyond which the rate of posts increased on net.

In January 2019, Juul announced a $10 million advertising campaign for cable television and radio, targeting current adult smokers in an attempt to rebrand Juul as a switching product.

In March 2019, it was reported that Juul was pitching itself to employers and insurers to help their employees stop smoking cigarettes. As part of its "enterprise marketing", Juul is reportedly looking at identifying participants and offer them discounted products as well as "coaching" and other support including educational articles and instructional videos.

On September 9, 2019, the US FDA warned Juul to stop its deceptive marketing practices. On September 25, 2019, Juul announced that they would stop all marketing in the United States. Juul's marketing approaches to youth in the UK were restricted in October 2019 after a settlement was reached with the Center for Environmental Health.

=== Changes to marketing practices in the US ===
On October 17, 2019, Juul agreed to make changes to its youth advertising practices as part of a settlement with the Center for Environmental Health. The first legally binding agreement establishes the right for the Center for Environmental Health to sue Juul if they violate any portion of the agreement. The agreement states that Juul will not:

- Advertise or promote its products in media whose audience is 15% or more under the age of 21
- Market or advertise on social media (except for Juul's age-restricted YouTube channel)
- Use models under the age of 28 in its advertisements
- Advertise within 1000 feet of schools or playgrounds
- Sponsor or advertise at sporting events or concerts that allow people under the age of 21
- Pay for or permit company employees or contractors to appear at school or youth-oriented educational programs or events
- Continue to use the terms "adults only" or "not for use by minors," which may entice minors to use Juul products, and replace them with the phrase "the sale of tobacco products to minors is prohibited by law"
- Allow unlimited purchase of its product and set clear limits on bulk sales of Juul products at brick and mortar outlets, as well as online

Lastly, the settlement also requires Juul to continue its "secret shopper" program with specific rules on actions the company must take if a store sells a product to a Juul secret shopper without asking for proof of age.

With the changes, Juul also announced that it would discontinue its mango, creme, fruit and cucumber flavors that were sold through its online store. The tobacco, mint and menthol flavors would remain for sale. The discontinuation of these products would only be applicable in the US, with all other countries continuing to sell flavored pods. In November 2019 Juul announced they would discontinue selling mint flavored pods in the US.

=== The Switch Network ===
On October 1, 2019, it was reported that Juul had set up an astroturfing campaign called the Switch Network, intended to recruit consumers who are prepared to sign petitions, contact local officials, attend public rallies or protests, testify in public hearings or share their stories with the press to protest restrictions that Juul called "unfair and misguided".

=== Sponsoring ===
Juul was one of the corporate sponsors of the California Democratic Party Conference from May 31 through June 2, 2019, drawing criticism from some politicians and public health officials. The company's logo was prominently displayed on a large screen while Nancy Pelosi, the Speaker of the House at the time, gave a speech. Juul Labs also sponsored two events with the Centre for Policy Studies, a think tank and pressure group in the United Kingdom, at the Conservative Party Conference. The first event on September 29, 2019, was a reception in celebration of the Conservative Party's bright new thinkers. The second event on October 1, 2019, was a panel discussion with Jo Churchill, MP and then the Parliamentary Under-Secretary of State, Department of Health and Social Care, on the topic "Why Inequality in Britain is About More Than Money".

== Legal issues ==
=== US Food and Drug Administration investigations ===
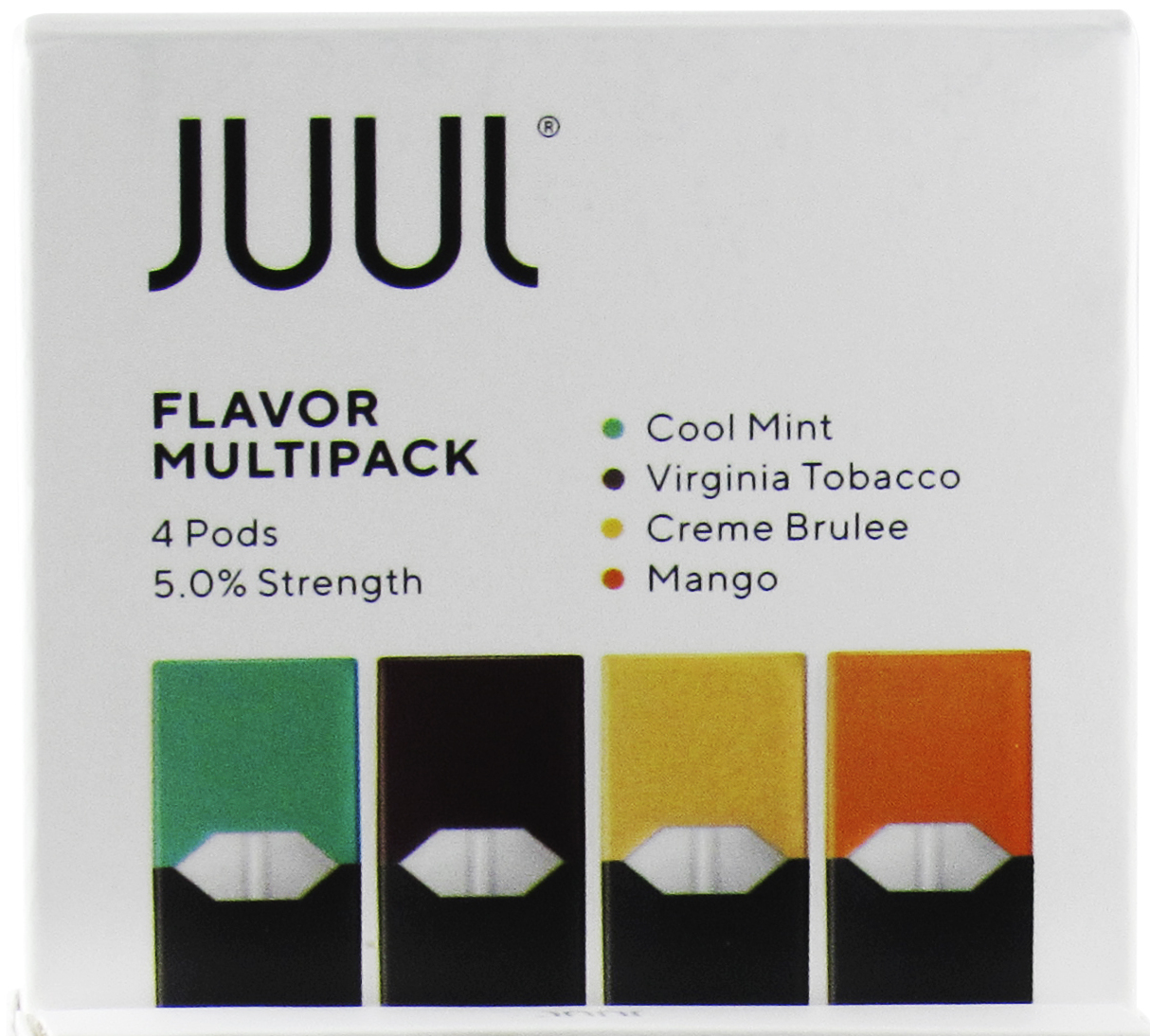
After the FDA investigation on youth vaping, Juul reduced the promotion of some sweet flavors.

In April 2018, the US Food and Drug Administration (FDA) requested that Juul Labs turn over documents to "better understand the reportedly high rates of youth use and the particular youth appeal of these products." The FDA's request included asking the company to provide documents about the design and marketing of the Juul, research on the safety of the products, and whether certain features of the device's design appeal to specific age groups. FDA also asked eBay to remove several listings of Juul products, which eBay complied with.

FDA commissioner Dr. Scott Gottlieb expressed concern about how the Juul can be easily disguised as a USB flash drive and that the Juul delivers a high amount of nicotine. "We don't yet fully understand why these products are so popular among youth," Dr. Gottlieb said, adding that "These documents may help us get there." In response, Juul Labs stated that they would spend $30 million on a campaign to keep Juul out of the hands of young people in addition to working with the FDA, which they announced in a press release in April 2018. Juul Labs also announced their support for raising the minimum age for vaping products from 18 to 21.

Juul Labs CEO Kevin Burns said, "we are committed to deterring young people, as well as adults who do not currently smoke from using our products. We cannot be more emphatic on this point: No young person or non-nicotine user should ever try Juul." The FDA followed up by issuing more than 60 warning letters and fines to stores that were found to be illegally selling Juul products to minors.

In September 2018, the FDA sent letters to Juul Labs and the manufacturers of the four other largest e-cigarette brands in the US—R.J. Reynolds' Vuse, Altria's MarkTen, Imperial Brands' blu eCigs, and Japan Tobacco International's Logic—giving them 60 days to lay out their plans to address widespread youth use of their products. If they fail to comply, FDA may "remove some or all of their flavored products that may be contributing to the rise in youth use from the market." FDA also sent over 1,300 warning letters to stores that undercover investigators had found to be selling Juul and other e-cigarettes to minors, and issued 131 fines ranging from $279 to $11,182.

Juul responded with a statement that "Juul Labs will work proactively with FDA in response to its request." A Juul spokeswoman also announced that Juul has its own patrol of retailers who advertise to youths or who do not enforce age requirements, noting that it had requested the removal of over 5,500 posts from Instagram, 144 posts from Facebook Marketplace, and 33 from Amazon.com. In total, Instagram removed 4,562 of 5,500 posts, Facebook Marketplace removed 45 of 145, and Amazon took down 13 of 33. An April 2018 survey by the Truth Initiative found that 89% of adolescents who attempted to buy Juul online succeeded, however, and Gottlieb said that Juul's efforts "didn't have the intended impact or I wouldn't be viewing the statistics I'm now seeing."

The FDA made an unannounced inspection of Juul headquarters in late September 2018 to gather information on the firm's marketing methods. FDA announced afterwards that it had seized thousands of pages of documents on Juul Labs' marketing practices. Shares of three Big Tobacco companies—Altria, Philip Morris International, and British American Tobacco—rose at the news of the inspection.

On November 13, 2018, 60 days after the FDA's ultimatum, Juul announced it would stop accepting retail orders for mango, fruit, creme, and cucumber Juul pods in compliance with the FDA's investigation. Juul will continue to sell Virginia tobacco, classic tobacco, and menthol flavored pods in retail stores, and noted that it will renew retail sales of its other flavors at stores that invest in age-verification technology. In addition, the company said they would shut down their Facebook and Instagram accounts in the U.S. that promote the use of flavored pods, which entice underage users. In September 2019, President Donald Trump announced a potential ban on a majority of flavored e-cigarettes with the exception of menthol.

=== Multi-state investigation in the United States ===
On February 25, 2020, it was announced that 39 U.S. states were investigating the marketing and sales of vaping products made by Juul. The scope of the investigation includes whether the company targeted youths and made misleading claims about nicotine content in its devices. Attorneys general from Connecticut, Florida, Nevada, Oregon and Texas said they were leading the multi-state investigation.

=== Lawsuits ===
Since 2019, over 2,300 personal injury, government entity, tribal, and class action cases have been filed against Juul in federal court. In October 2019, all federal lawsuits against Juul were consolidated into a multidistrict litigation in the Northern District of California before Judge William Orrick III.

Various governing bodies have alleged in suits that Juul markets an unsafe product to children, including state attorneys general in Arizona, California, Illinois, Massachusetts, Minnesota, Mississippi, New York, and North Carolina, the District of Columbia, and the school districts of Three Village Central in New York, La Conner in Washington, Olathe in Kansas, and Francis Howell in Missouri.

Individual suits for damages caused by injury and wrongful death allege that Juul products were addictive and inappropriately marketed as safe and not addictive and were advertised and sold online to minors. The family of one teenager alleged he was enticed by Juul's "candy-like flavors, sleek and discreet design, and its representations that it was a healthier alternative to combustible cigarettes." Juul did not place nicotine warnings on its products until August 2018, according to one complaint.

Investor class action lawsuits were also filed on behalf on behalf of shareholders of Altria Group, alleging Altria failed to conduct sufficient due diligence prior to the company's investment in Juul, failed to inform the investors about risks associated with Juul's products and marketing practices, the mounting public scrutiny and its impact on the Altria business, and that some of the company's public statements were false and misleading. An administrative complaint raised by the Federal Trade Commission against Altria for its Juul stake was dismissed.

In October 2019, a lawsuit was filed in US District Court for the Northern District of California by Siddharth Breja, who was the former senior vice president of global finance for Juul. Breja contends he was fired in March 2019, a week after voicing concerns regarding Juul's contaminated products. In February 2019, Breja disagreed with selling pods that were close to a year old. In response, then Juul CEO Kevin Burns allegedly said, "Half our customers are drunk and vaping like mo-fos, who the fuck is going to notice the quality of our pods." A representative for Burns relayed a message made by Burns to Vice: "I never said this, or anything remotely close to this, period. As CEO, I had the company make huge investments in product quality and the facts will show this claim is absolutely false and pure fiction."

Further lawsuits came in 2022. In April, 30 individual plaintiffs across three separate cases similarly alleged that Juul's marketing "targeted youths and young adults with aggressive advertising campaigns" and misrepresented its products as safe. The complaints also argued that the company neglected to inform customers as to the products' addictiveness. In September 2022, Juul had to pay $438.5M as a settlement after a two-year-long investigation into the company's marketing and sales practices aimed at teenagers and minors, led by several US states. As part of the deal, Juul agreed to stop using people under 35 years in their advertisements. The company continues to face litigation in other states that were not part of the settlement as well as multiple private lawsuits.

In December 2022, Juul agreed to pay $1.2 billion to settle about 10,000 lawsuits claiming the company as a major cause for the youth-vaping epidemic in the U.S.

In April 2023, Juul Labs announced its decision to pay $462 million (£372 million) to settle legal claims over false marketing aimed at enticing young buyers. These claims were brought forth by six US states: California, Colorado, Illinois, Massachusetts, New Mexico, and New York. Payments of the agreed amount will take place over the course of eight years. Juul denied wrongdoing and attributed the settlement to its "commitment to resolve issues from the company's past".

=== Infringements and counterfeit pods ===
Counterfeit Juul pods are manufactured in China and Juul has filed lawsuits against 30 Chinese companies. Counterfeit Juul-compatible pods have seen sold on Alibaba and an influx appeared in "local [US] markets" following Juul's discontinuation of several flavors.

The company filed a complaint with the U.S. International Trade Commission (ITC) in early-October 2018 over counterfeit products manufactured by companies in the United States and China that Juul Labs says infringed on its US patents. The complaint seeks to end importation of these products into the US. In February 2019, Juul sued several companies for infringing on its trademarks, among which was a cartoon logo titled the Juul Monster.

=== E-cigarette bans ===
In June 2019, the City of San Francisco passed legislation banning the sale of e-cigarettes online as well as offline, and a separate ordinance preventing e-cigarette manufacturers from occupying city-owned property. Proponents of the bill have said that they want the bill to serve as a warning to Juul that they were not wanted in the city. The decision to ban sales to the city was to ensure that the FDA began its pre-market review of e-cigarette products immediately. The San Francisco Port Commission, which owns and operates the heritage structure at Pier 70, has supported the legislation to prevent Juul and also companies that are active in the tobacco, firearms and alcohol business from occupying property that belongs to the city. Because the June 2019 ordinance did not apply retroactively, Juul was able to maintain its location at Pier 70. Juul spent at least $4.3 million in support of Proposition C to try to rescind the ban on flavored e-cigarettes in San Francisco. On September 30, 2019, Juul announced it will no longer actively support Proposition C.

On June 23, 2022, the FDA ordered Juul to remove all of its products from the United States market. The "marketing denial" order is in response to a Premarket Tobacco Product Application Juul had submitted two years earlier. It applies to "all of their products currently marketed in the United States." The FDA has previously authorized other companies to sell vaping products intended for adults, but it cited Juul for targeting its products and advertising specifically to young people. The company said it would appeal and seek a stay of the decisions.

Later the same day, a panel of the U.S. District Court for the District of Columbia issued a stay on the order while the Court reviews the case. In response to the order, groups in support of removing electronic cigarettes from the market stated their support while complaints from adult nicotine vape users have been featured. Multiple corporate valuations for Juul were written down in the wake of the order, with some being cut by up to 88%. Juul also sought consulting regarding the legal and restructuring realities it faced following the order.

== See also ==
- Electronic cigarette and e-cigarette liquid marketing
- Nicotine marketing
