= Pax Labs =

American electronic vaporizer company

- Type: Private
- Industry: Cannabis
- Founded: June 2007; 19 years ago in San Francisco, California
- Founders: James Monsees; Adam Bowen
- Headquarters: 660 Alabama Street, San Francisco, California, United States
- Areas served: United States; Canada; Israel
- Products: Electronic vaporizers
- Website: pax.com

Pax Labs (stylized as PAX Labs) is an American electronic vaporizer company founded in 2007 that markets the Pax vaporizers. The company developed the Juul (pronounced jewel) e-cigarette. Juul Labs was spun out as a separate company in 2017.

== History ==
In 2005, two former cigarette smokers, Adam Bowen and James Monsees, met while they were graduate students in product-design at Stanford University and developed an e-cigarette called Ploom. Monsees and Bowen founded the Ploom company to distribute their e-cigarette in 2007. Unable to find support from financial institutions, Ploom relied on private investors to launch their products. In August 2016, Tyler Goldman joined Monsees and Bowen, becoming the CEO of Pax. The initial Ploom e-cigarette did not have commercial success; it experienced multiple technical errors that caused people to be burned, receive an electrical shock, and struggle to make the pod release the product.

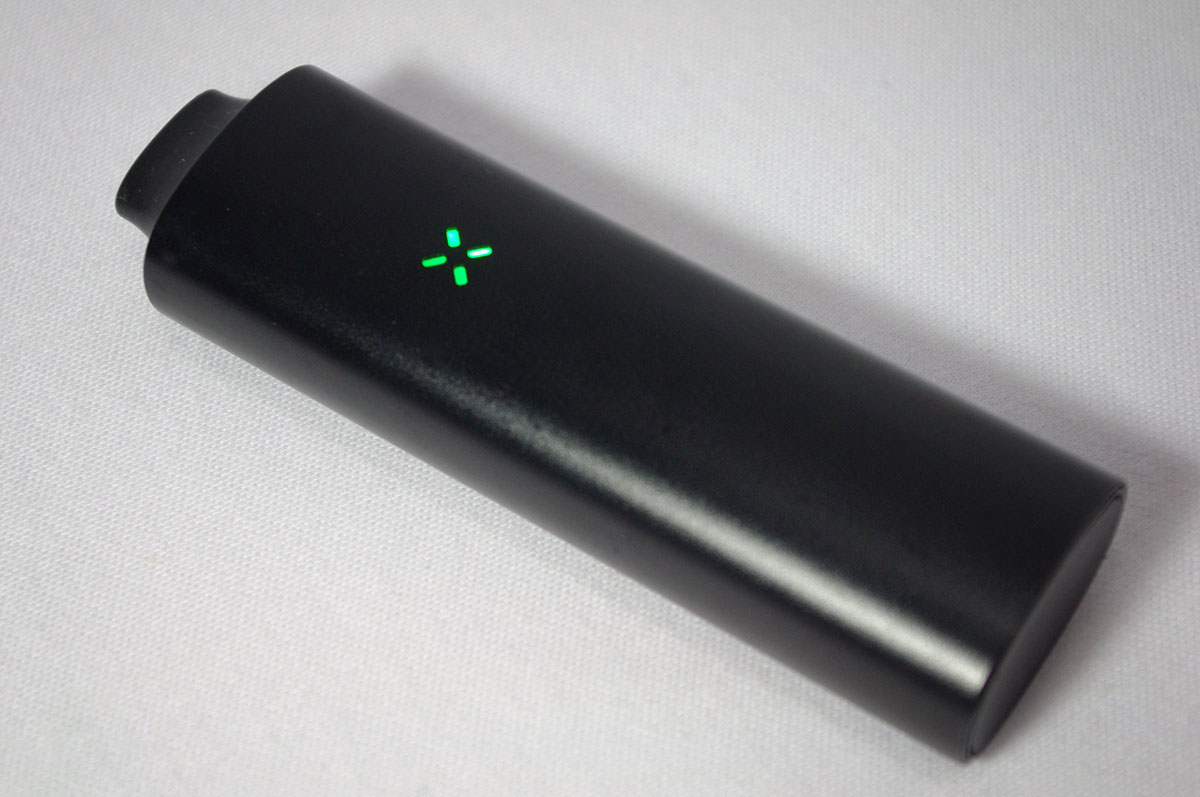
Pax handheld vaporizer, about 10.5 cm long.

In 2011, Japan Tobacco International invested $10 million into the company. Ploom used this money to create the Pax, a vaporizer for loose leaf tobacco. While the product was invented to support smokers, cannabis users discovered that the Pax streamlined the cannabis experience.As Pax became associated with cannabis, JTI asked to part ways with Ploom. Ploom retained their rights to the Pax product, while Ploom changed their name to Pax Labs and bought JTI out of their share.

Bowen left Pax in June 2017, Monsees left Pax in July 2017, and Goldman left Pax in December 2017. Bharat Vasan was CEO from February 2018 until September 2019.

It markets the Pax vaporizers, starting with the Pax by Ploom. As Pax Labs, Inc., the company then introduced the Pax 2 and can be used with loose-leaf tobacco or cannabis. In November 2016, the Pax 3 was released, featuring compatibility with both extracts and plant matter, new tools and accessories, and a complementary smartphone app. The same month, Pax also introduced an extract-based vaporizer called the Era, which operates by heating a concentrated cannabis liquid held in very small containers.

Pax closed a $420 million equity round in April 2019, which valued the company at $1.7 billion. In June 2019, Pax announced it had signed agreements with four Canadian pot stocks, Aurora Cannabis, Aphria, OrganiGram Holdings and The Supreme Cannabis Company, to supply it with cannabis extracts, resins, and distillates for its PAX Era pen-and-pod vape system.

As of 2023, Pax distributes products in the United States, Canada, Germany, Spain, France, and the United Kingdom.

== Juul ==
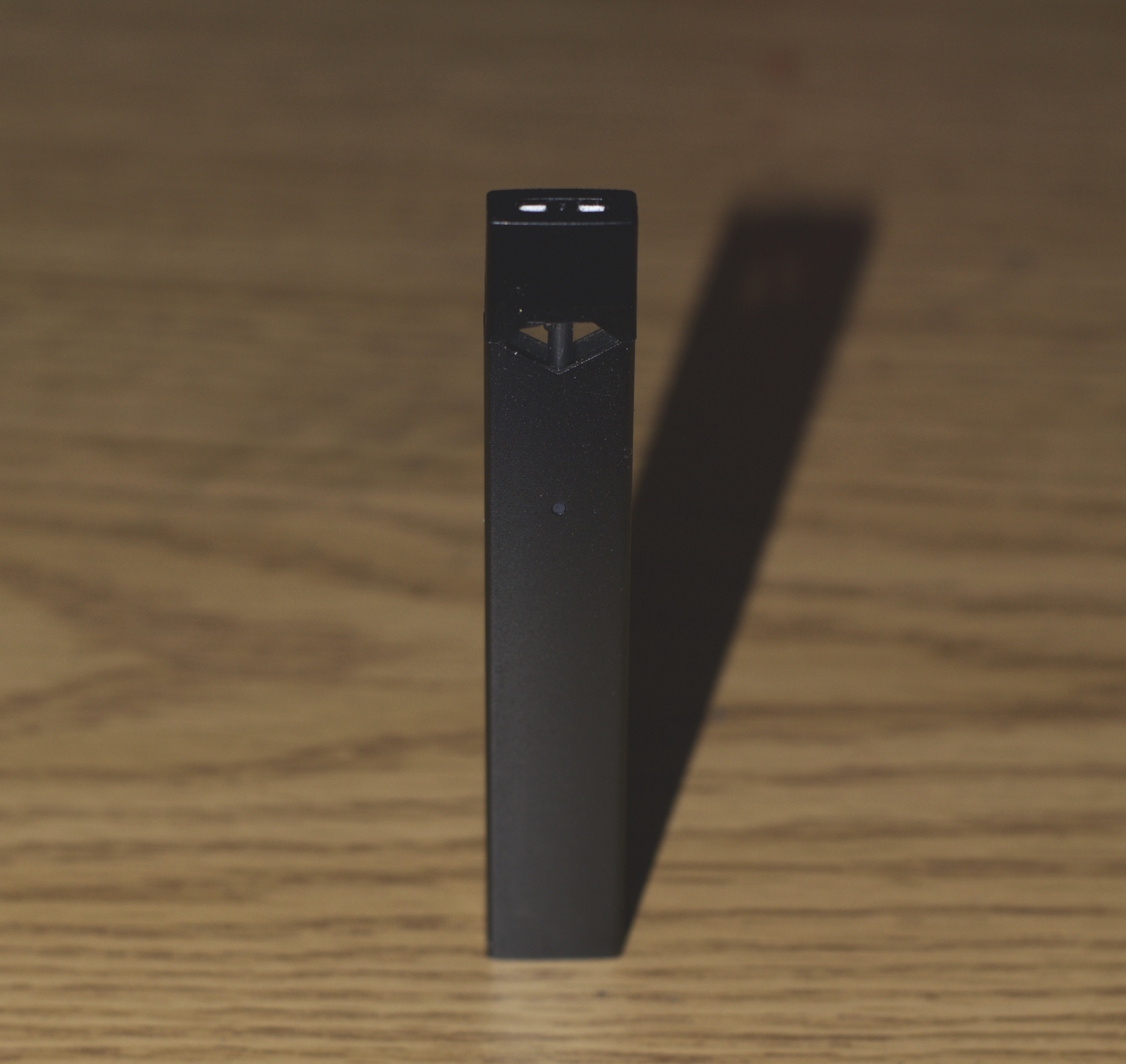
Juul vaporizer

In June 2015, the company introduced Juul, a type of e-cigarette that utilizes nicotine salts that exist in leaf-based tobacco, for its key ingredient. They were given a US patent for their nicotine salt preparation in 2015. The nicotine salts are said to create an experience more like smoking than other e-cigarettes on the market. The e-cigarette is shaped like a USB flash drive and recharges using a magnetic USB deck. Each cartridge (called a Juul pod) contains about the same amount of nicotine as one pack of cigarettes and delivers approximately 200 hits.

Juul attempts to deliver a nicotine peak in five minutes, similar to a traditional cigarette. Mango was among the five most popular flavors, but it is no longer available in the United States where now only menthol and tobacco flavors are sold. A Juul starter kit sells for about $49.99. Given the high nicotine concentrations in Juul, the nicotine-related health consequences of its use by young people could be more severe than those from their use of other e-cigarette products.

In 2017 Juul Labs was spun out of Pax Labs as an independent company. Tyler Goldman, former CEO of Pax Labs, was named CEO of Juul after the spin-off.

== PAX Vaporizer ==
=== PAX 1 ===
Originally released in 2012, the PAX 1 was the first of the dry herb vaporizers to be sold by Ploom before the company became known as PAX Labs.

=== PAX 2 ===
The second PAX vaporizer was released on March 10, 2015. This model of the PAX line featured a smaller design than the original device.

=== PAX 3 ===
In November 2016, the third PAX device was released. This was the first model to allow the use of both dry herbs and cannabis concentrates (via use of a concentrate insert). The PAX 3 delivers the same temperature range as the PAX 2; from 360 to 420 °F (182 to 216 °C). The PAX 3 offers improved temperature adjustability, down to the precise degree. The PAX 2 only offered four pre-determined temperature settings within this range. The PAX 3 features wireless connectivity to smartphones via the PAX application.

=== PAX Era ===
Released alongside the PAX 3 in late 2016, the PAX Era was the first cannabis vaporizer to use proprietary PAX Pod cartridges. Similar in design to PAX Labs' previous device, the Juul, the PAX Era uses food-grade polycarbonate cartridges which are filled with pure cannabis oil. Like the PAX 3 vaporizer, the PAX Era may be wirelessly connected to smartphones via the PAX application.

=== PAX Era Pro ===
PAX introduces its Era Pro vaporizer, an update to the original Era model. Compared to its predecessor, the Pro edition features several add-ons, including ExpertTemp technology, pod memory, haptic feedback, and a UL-certified battery. The PAX Era Pro works with pre-filled cannabis oil PAX pods and has a temperature range from 518 to 788 °F (270 to 420 °C).

=== PAX Mini ===
The PAX Mini was released in November 2022, featuring a smaller design than the dry herb vaporizers previously made by PAX Labs. Updates include a larger LED, a soft matte finish, and rounded edges. The device is available in the colors poppy, silver, and onyx.

=== PAX Plus ===
The PAX Plus was released in November 2022, the larger oven capacity makes it better for sharing than the MINI, but session volumes are adjustable when utilizing the concentrate insert and half-pack oven lid. The PAX Plus comes set with four Experience Modes, where as the PAX 3 has four settings, each set at specific temperatures.

=== PAX Flow ===
The PAX Flow was released in August 2025. It features a re-designed airflow path with an oven chamber on the side of the device, rather than on the bottom as in all previous PAX generations. It is also the first PAX device to use hybrid conduction-convection heating and to support USB-C charging. It has an oven capacity of 0.3 g and five preset temperature modes.

=== PAX Mini 2 ===
The PAX Mini 2 was released in August 2025, concurrent with the launch of the Pax Flow. However, it did not receive an official announcement from PAX Labs. It retains the form factor of the original PAX Mini but incorporates elements of the PAX Plus, such as a larger oven and four temperature modes.
