= Ploom =

Brand of heated tobacco and e-cigarette products

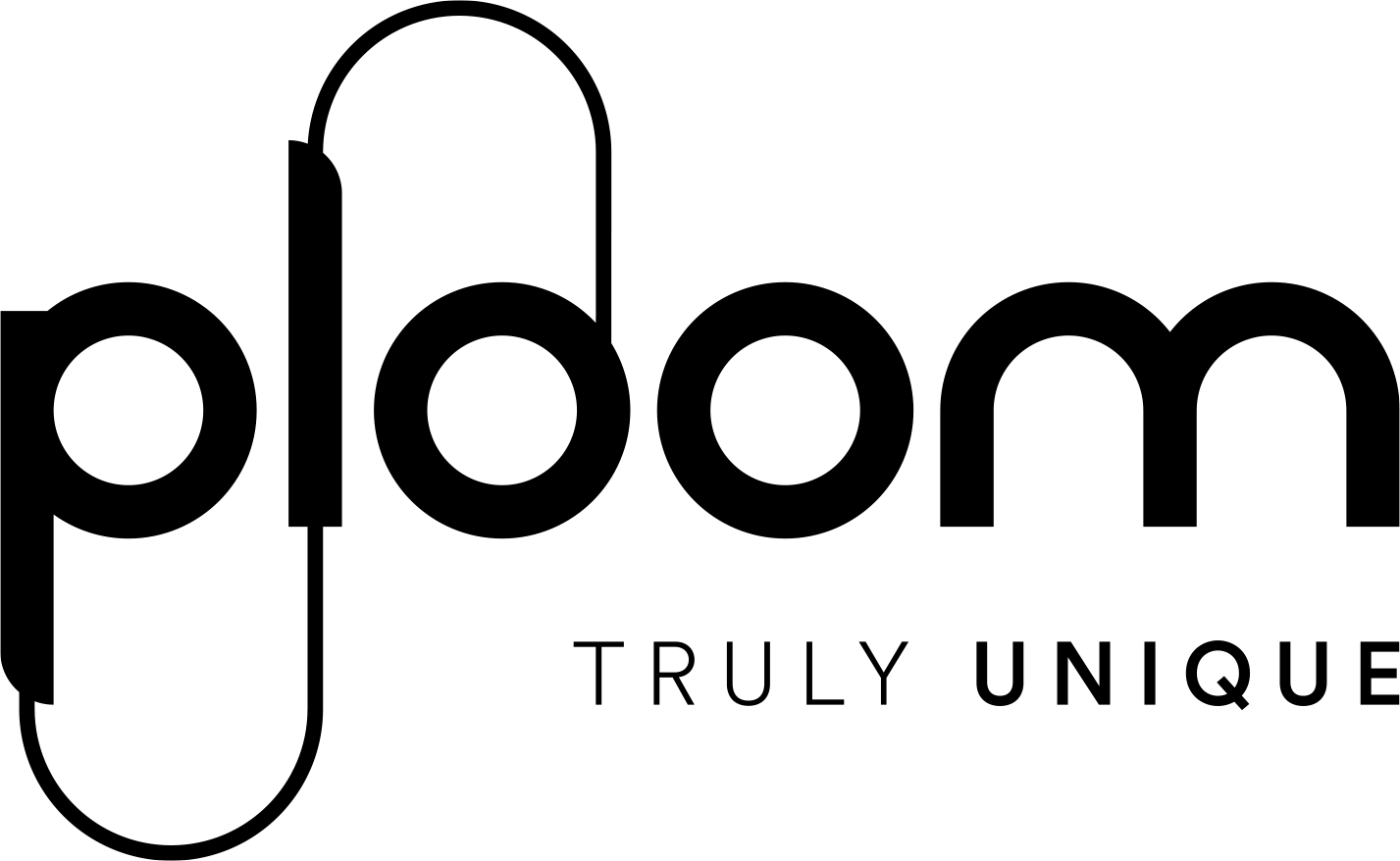
- Industry: Tobacco
- Predecessor: Pax Labs
- Founded: 2007
- Founder: Adam Bowen; James Monsees
- Owner: Japan Tobacco International
- Website: https://www.ploom.com/

Ploom is a brand of tobacco heating devices that integrates aspects of both traditional and electronic cigarettes. The device employs a technology that heats tobacco without combustion. It is marketed by Japan Tobacco Inc. (JTI).

== History ==
=== Early Developments ===
Ploom was initially developed in California by James Monsees and Adam Bowen. The two friends were studying design at Stanford University. For their final thesis, they developed the design of an e-cigarette that would provide smokers with the nicotine they seek without the additional carcinogenic substances resulting from burning tobacco. Two years later, in 2007, they founded the company Ploom to distribute their e-cigarette. Unable to find support from financial institutions, Ploom relied on private investors like Nicholas J. Pritzker to launch their products.

In 2010, Ploom released a model called the Ploom Model One Vaporizer, designed like an oversize pen. The initial Ploom e-cigarette did not have commercial success.

=== Partnership between JTI and Ploom ===
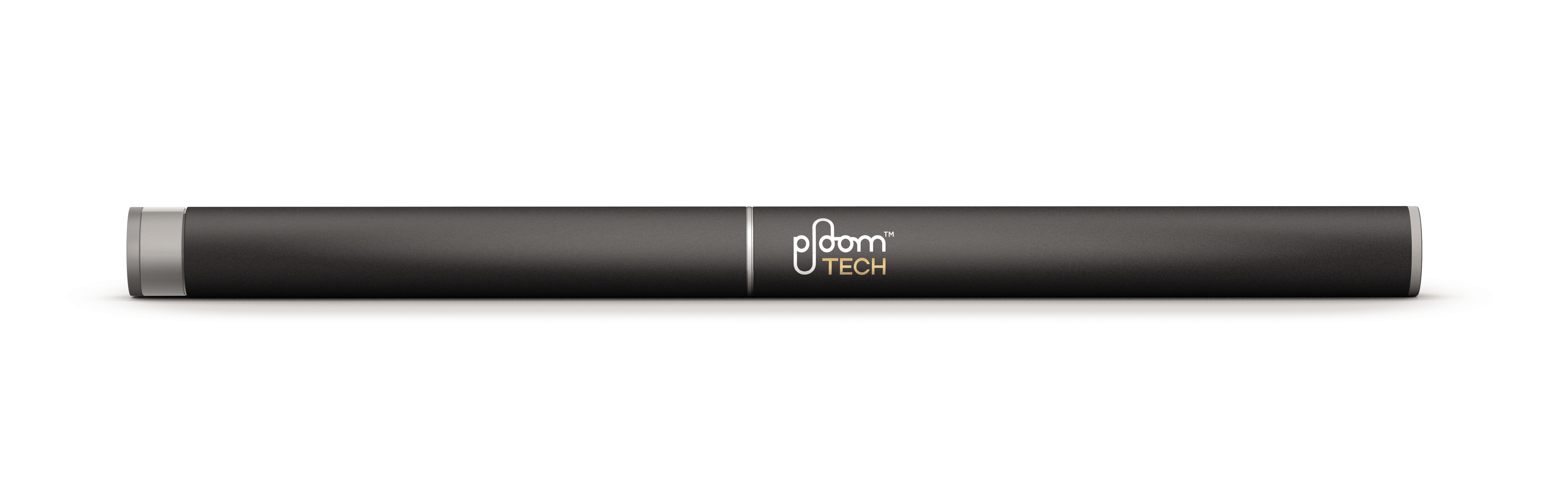
An early Ploom device.

In 2011, Japan Tobacco International invested $10 million into the company. Ploom used this money to create the Pax, a vaporizer that resembled a stubby iPhone. Subsequently, Ploom released the ModelTwo. In 2015, JTI acquired the patents and trademarks. JTI retains the rights to manufacture and distribute the ModelTwo device and the pods product line.

While the product was invented to support smokers, cannabis users discovered that the Pax streamlined the cannabis experience. JTI asked to part ways with Ploom. Ploom retained their rights to the Pax product, while Ploom changed their name to Pax Labs and bought JTI out of their share.

=== After the JTI Takeover ===
In 2016, Ploom was launched on the Japanese market and then in other countries, including France, Italy, South Korea and Switzerland. The initial launch in Fukuoka, Japan, was so popular that shipments were suspended after a week due to a supply shortage. According to JTI, Ploom would make it possible to inhale 99% of harmful constituents in less, compared to a cigarette that burns. But the owner also acknowledges that no toxicity studies have been conducted on Ploom.

In 2023, Japan Tobacco launched an updated heated-tobacco device, Ploom X Advanced and said sales of the previous Ploom X model would be discontinued after 20 November 2023. Japan Tobacco stated Ploom X Advanced would be sold nationwide in Japan from 21 November 2023, following an online pre-sale beginning 31 October 2023. In 2024, Japan Tobacco’s chief executive said the company was “at the investment stage” and was putting about ¥450bn into its reduced-risk products business over the three years up to 2026 with Ploom as its flagship heated-tobacco brand. In October that year, Japan Tobacco said Ploom’s geographic expansion had reached 23 markets which expanded to 24 markets by the end of 2024 and 12.6% in the last quarter of 2024. Japan Tobacco’s chief executive told the Financial Times that the company aimed to cover about 80% of the world’s main heated-tobacco markets by the end of 2025 and expand to around 40 markets by the end of 2026.

In May 2025, Japan Tobacco launched a next-generation Ploom device, Ploom AURA, alongside a new heated tobacco sticks brand, EVO. In July, a nationwide rollout began in Japan. Also that month, Japan Tobacco International said it was open to assembling Ploom devices in the United States, citing supply-chain considerations, ahead of a planned U.S. launch through its joint venture with Altria.

In October 2025, Japan Tobacco said Ploom AURA and EVO helped lift its heated-tobacco segment share in Japan to 15.5% in the third quarter of 2025, and that the number of Ploom users in Japan had nearly doubled versus two years earlier.

In 2023, Romania is the tenth country where JTI is launching Ploom. JTI plans to invest $3 billion in the global expansion of Ploom and is targeting 24 countries in 2024.

In November 2024, JTI launched Ploom in the Philippines, with availability initially in selected retail locations in Metro Manila and via the ploom.ph online store.
