= V2 Cigs =

Electronic cigarette manufacturer and brand

V2
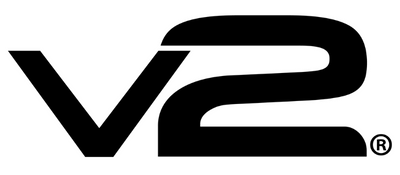
- Product type: Electronic cigarette
- Current owner: V2 Cigs UK
- Produced by: V2 Cigs UK / ECO Juices (Global) Limited
- Introduced: 2010; 16 years ago
- Related brands: Vsavi; Vapour2; Vapor Couture
- Markets: Worldwide
- Previous owners: VMR Products (2009–18)
- Website: www.buyv2cigs.co.uk

V2 is a brand of electronic cigarettes, currently produced by British manufacturer V2 Cigs UK also under the brand name Vsavi. The V2 brand started in 2010 by American company VMR Products, and it became one of the largest independent domestic e-cigarette vendors for a number of years. The company was sold to Juul Labs in 2018 and closed down, after which its British distributor revived and has since continued to market V2.

== History ==
=== Foundation and growth ===
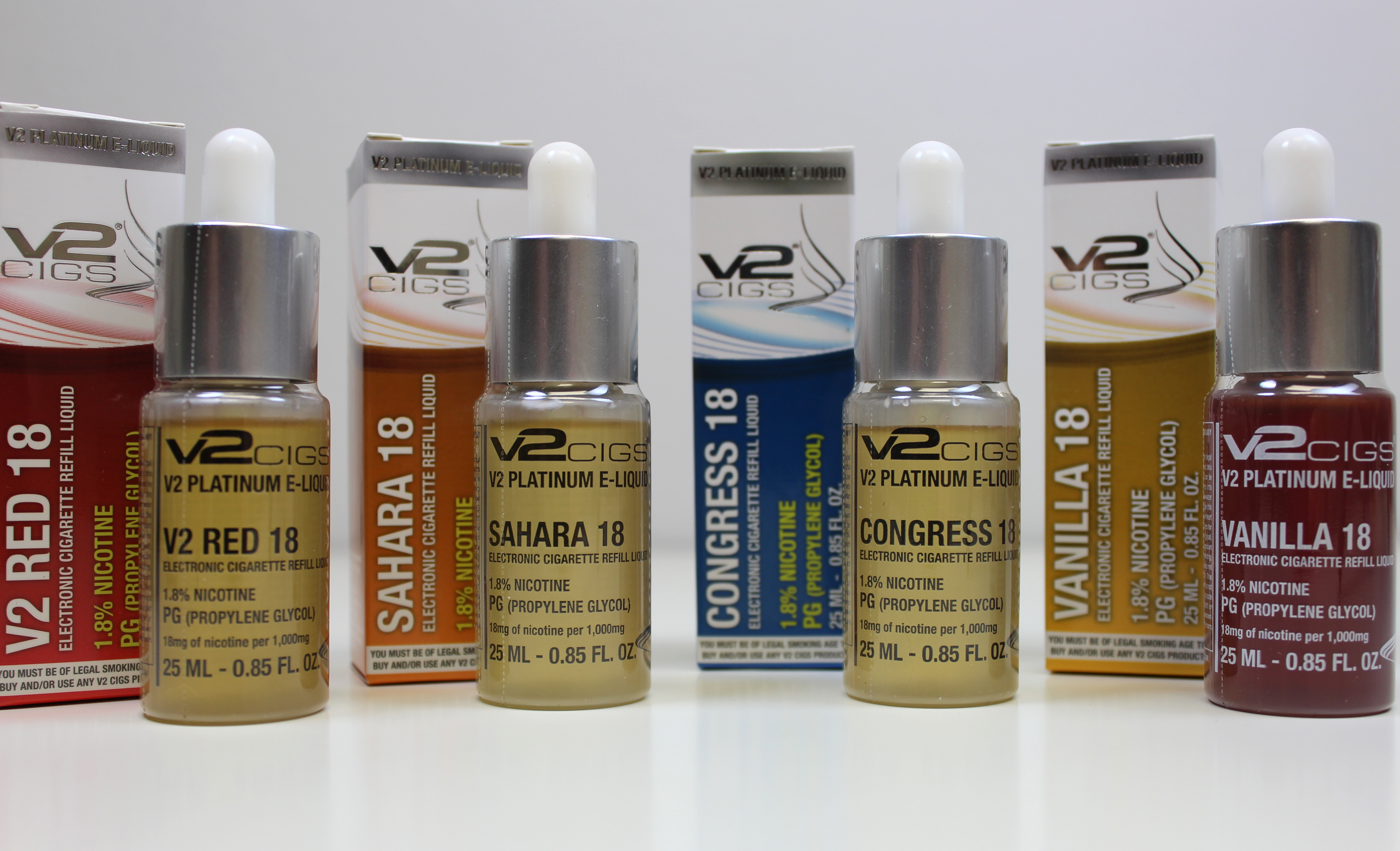
V2 Cigs branded e-liquids

VMR Products was founded in 2009 by Jan Andries Verleur and Dan Recio in Miami, United States. According to Recio, the term "V2" means "Your life, Version 2.0". The company began selling their V2 electronic cigarette on V2cigs.com beginning June 7, 2010. Within a year, company revenue hit $19 million. Operations were split between Miami, Shenzhen and a distribution center in Prague, Czech Republic.

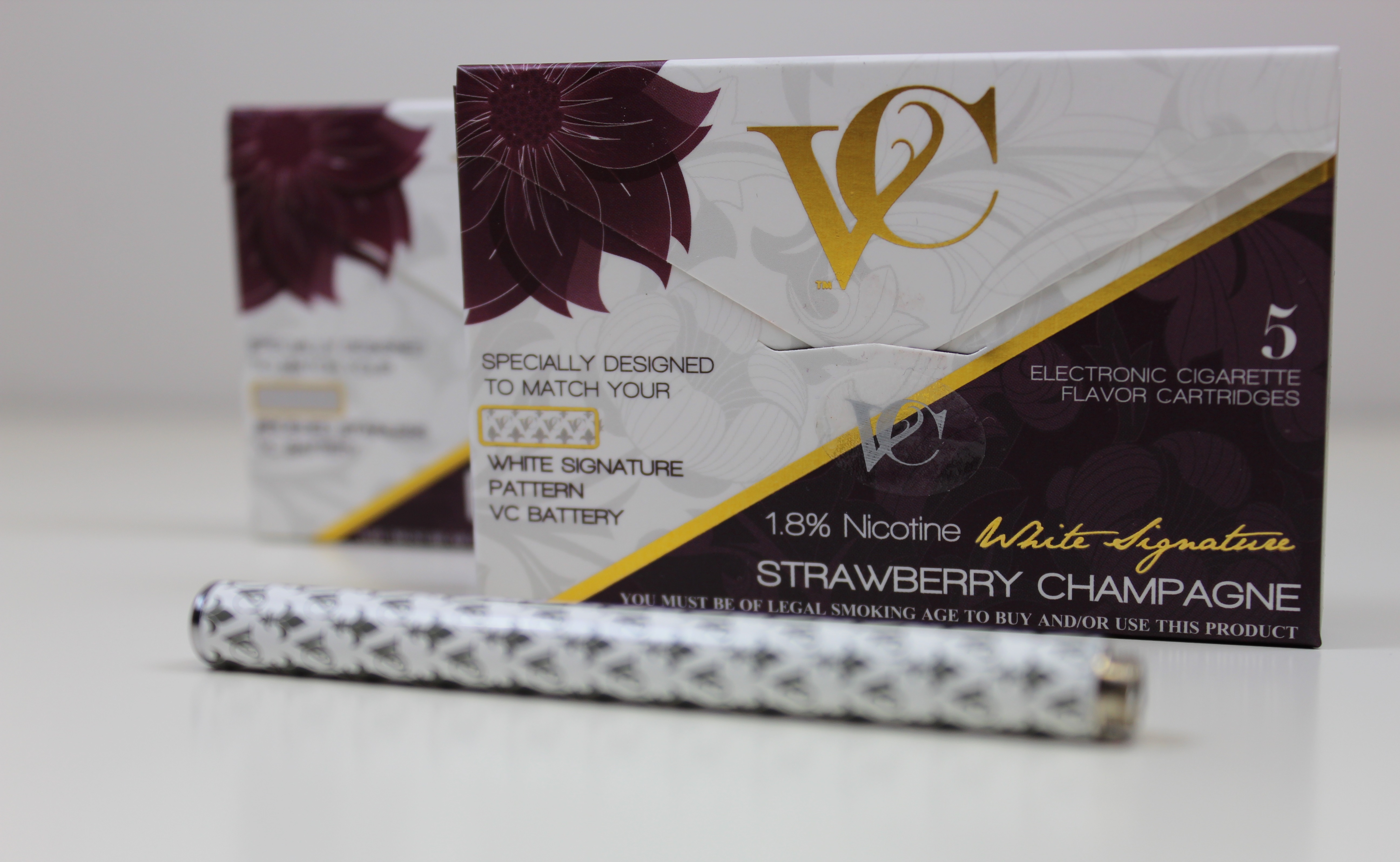
Strawberry Champagne flavor Vapor Couture

V2 claimed to have been the "world's largest online retailer of e-cigarettes" since 2011. While its sales were predominantly online, it started expanding to brick and mortar stores and gas stations. As of 2013, the company was expected to make $80 million in net sales, up from $50 million in 2012. However, the market leader at the time was Lorillard-owned Blu, while start-up NJOY was another rising competitor. The company also launched a sister brand, Vapor Couture, targeted at women. It launched first in Europe in 2012. It was later rolled out in America with various colors like "Rose Gold," and flavors meant to appeal to women such as "Bombshell" and "Strawberry Champagne".

In July 2014, Time referred to the company as "the market leader in online sales of e-cigs". A February 2015 article in The Financial Times claimed the company was the "largest online seller of e-cigarettes in the world". As of that year, V2 products were also available in at least 40,000 U.S. physical stores.

=== Sales and closure of VMR ===
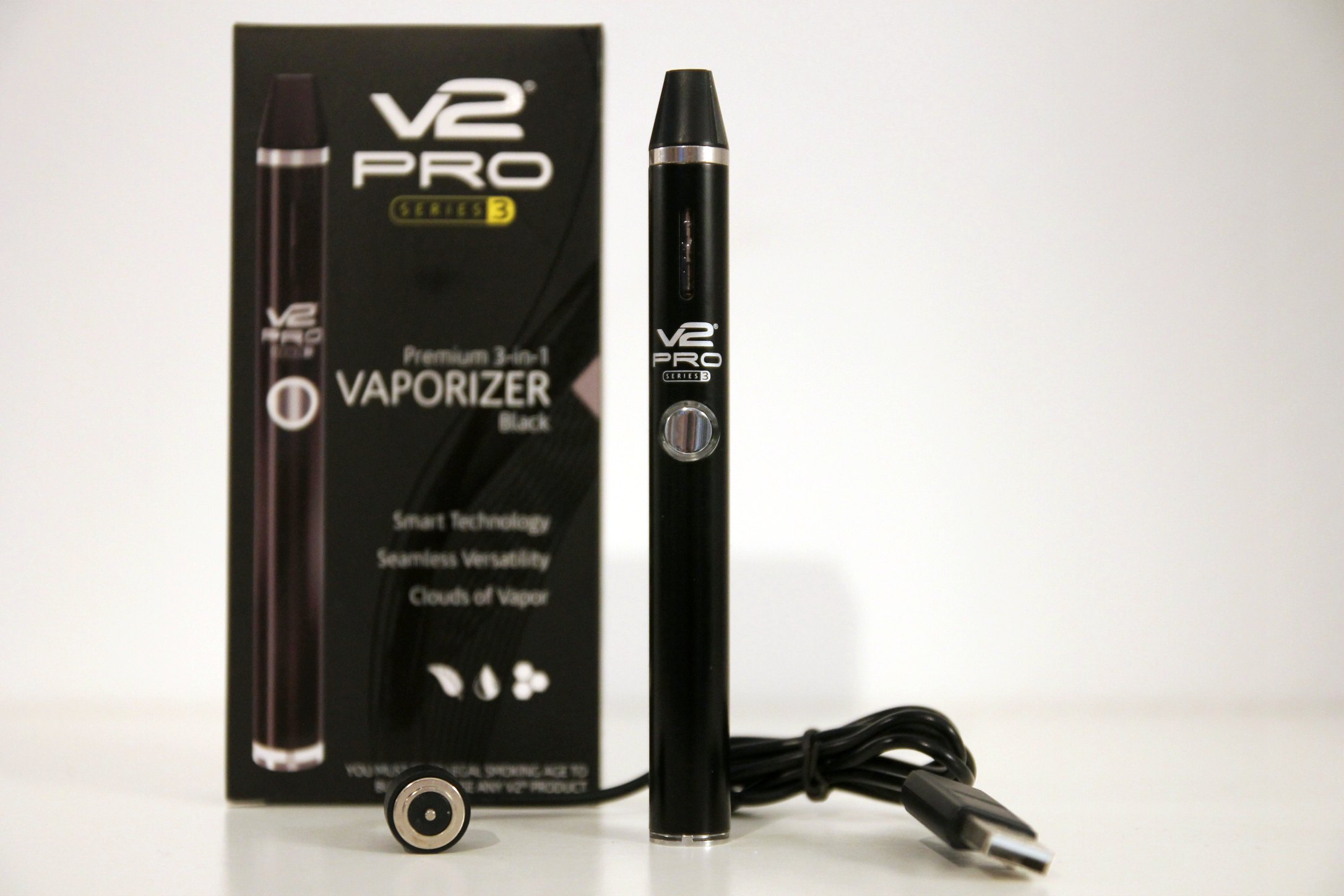
A V2 Pro Series 3 vaporizer

From December 2014, V2 Cigs started rebranding products to Vapour2 in Europe. In December 2015, China-based Huaobao International Holdings purchased a controlling 51% stake in VMR Products. Huabao is approved to sell vapor products by the Chinese State Tobacco Monopoly Administration, the government agency that controls the tobacco market in China. In 2015, VMR Products said that it will move its supply chain in-house instead of relying on third-party partners.

The Food and Drug Administration (FDA) enforcement of regulation of the American vaping industry in 2016 signalled trouble for V2 Cigs. Its manufacturer was also unable to legally release a new e-cigarette to compete against Juul which was swiftly rising in the market. In October 2018 Juul Labs, Inc. purchased VMR Products LLC, the parent company of V2 e-cigarettes in a $75 million deal. It was reported that Juul's rationale for the acquisition of VMR products was to gain access to the Chinese market. VMR Products and the V2 product line shut down effective on November 2, 2018 leaving millions of V2 customers at bay.

=== Current operations ===
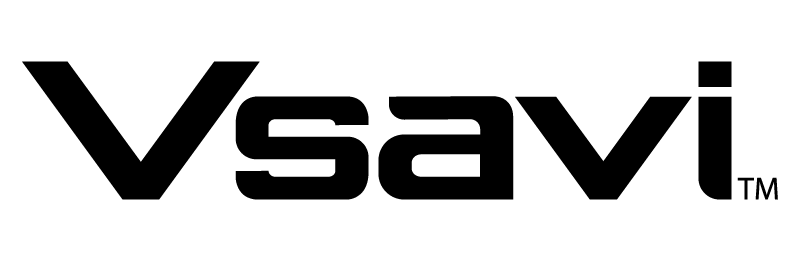
Logo of VSAVI

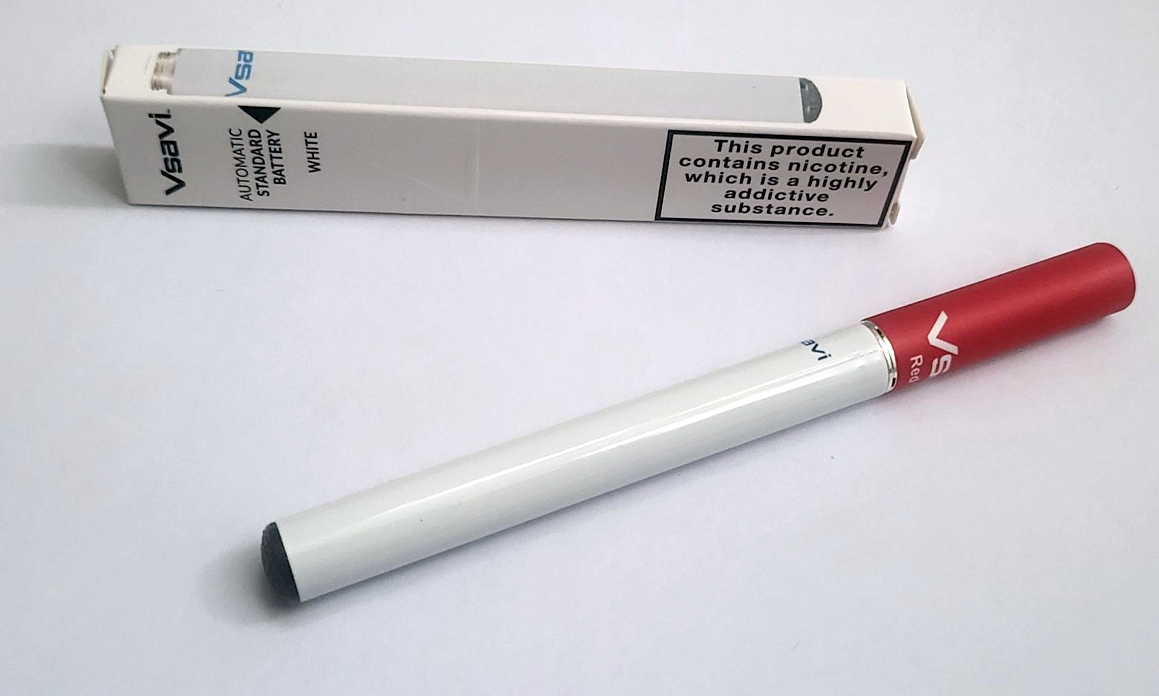
Vsavi branded Classic V2 e-cigarette with an inserted Red Tobacco cartridge

However, distribution of the V2 e-cigarettes have continued by V2 Cigs UK, which was originally founded as BuyV2Cigs as an authorised reseller of VMR Products's e-cigarette products in the United Kingdom. The company, based in Peterborough in England, ran its own manufacturing process and controlled the supply chain. After VMR's demise, V2 Cigs UK said in 2019 that it will now manufacture their own devices, e-liquid and other products including under the Vsavi (pronounced "V-savvy") brand as a recommencement of V2. The devices are fully compatible continuations of the former V2 products.

== Marketing ==
Between 2015 and 2016, V2 Cigs spent a total of $11,900 for radio advertisements in six American cities. The amount and timeslots for the ads were less compared to three of its rivals, Logic, VaporFi, and VaporShark.
