= Japan Tobacco International =

Japanese tobacco company

- Type: Subsidiary
- Industry: Tobacco
- Founded: 1999; 27 years ago
- Headquarters: Geneva, Switzerland
- Key people: Eddy Pirard (president and CEO); Koji Shimayoshi (Deputy CEO and Executive Vice President Business Development and Corporate Strategy)
- Products: Cigarettes, vaping products, roll-your-own tobacco, snus, pipe tobacco, cigars, nicotine pouches, heat-not-burn devices
- Number of employees: 46,000 (2024)
- Parent: Japan Tobacco
- Website: www.jti.com

Japan Tobacco International (JTI) is the international tobacco division of Japan Tobacco (Global Fortune 500), one of the three largest international Big Tobacco product manufacturers. The holding company is JT International SA and headquartered in Geneva, Switzerland. It sells its brands in 130 countries. It is the youngest of the big tobacco companies.

As of 2018, JTI employed around 46,000 people around the world at 400 offices, 27 factories, five research and development centers, and five tobacco-processing facilities.

Eddy Pirard is the president and CEO, and Koji Shimayoshi is the deputy CEO and executive vice president for business development and corporate strategy.

== History ==
JTI is the youngest of the big tobacco manufacturers and was formed in 1999 when Japan Tobacco Inc. purchased the international tobacco operations of the U.S. multinational R.J. Reynolds for $7.8 billion. Popular brands included Camel, Winston, Natural American Spirit (2015), Ploom and Evo.

In 2007, Gallaher Group, a FTSE 100 business, was acquired by Japan Tobacco Inc. for GBP 9.4 billion. At the time, this was the largest foreign acquisition by a Japanese company.

In 2009, the JT Group acquired part of the worldwide business of Tribac Leaf Limited (a company that trades tobacco in Africa), as well as two Brazilian companies active in the tobacco business, Kannenberg and KBH&C. In the same year, the JT Group also set up JTI Leaf Services, a joint venture with two leaf suppliers in the US – Hail & Cotton Inc. and JEB International.

In 2011, JTI invested $10 million into a startup called Ploom. Ploom used this money to create the Pax, a vaporizer for loose leaf tobacco. While the product was invented to support smokers, cannabis users discovered that the Pax streamlined the cannabis experience. As Pax became associated with cannabis, JTI asked to part ways with Ploom. JTI retained their rights to the Pax product (later known as the Ploom heated tobacco device), while Ploom changed their name to Pax Labs and bought JTI out of their share. Pax Labs would go on to develop the Juul vape device.

In 2018, JTI acquired Akij Group's Tobacco business for $1.47 billion. In 2022, the company's revenue in Russia amounted to 431 billion rubles. In 2022, JTI and Altria announced a strategic partnership to sell JTI's successful Ploom product in the U.S. market and potentially other ventures.

In 2024, Japan Tobacco International was named by Top Employers Institute as a top employer for the third year in a row. In that same year, JTI purchased Vector Group for 2.4 billion U.S. Dollars. Previously, JTI operated outside of the U.S., but this purchase gave JTI roughly 10% market share and two of the top ten cigarette brands in the U.S.

In November 2026, Russia placed four of parent company Japan Tobacco's Russian manufacturing subsidiaries under temporary administration by a Russian company. Japan Tobacco said the measure followed a presidential decree signed on 5 November and that it was assessing its response and the impact on the group.

== Canadian class action lawsuit ==
The three largest Canadian tobacco companies, Imperial Tobacco Canada, JTI-Macdonald Corp, and Rothmans Benson & Hedges, are the subject of the largest class-action lawsuit in Canadian history. The case started 12 March 2012 in Quebec Superior Court, and the companies face a potential payout of C$27 billion (US$20.18 billion) in damages and penalties. In addition, a number of Canadian provinces are teaming up to sue tobacco companies to recover healthcare costs caused by smoking.

On 1 June 2015, Québec Superior Court Justice Brian Riordan awarded more than $15 billion to Quebec smokers in a landmark case that pitted them against three Canadian cigarette giants, including JTI-Macdonald Corp. JTI was ordered to pay 13% of the total, or C$2bn. The company stated, "JTI-Macdonald Corp. fundamentally disagrees with today’s judgment and intends to file an appeal [...] The company strongly believes that the evidence presented at trial does not justify the court’s conclusions." The plaintiffs in the court case stated that even if an appeal were lodged, the companies were required to pay C$1bn within 60 days.

== Criticism ==
National Agency on Corruption Prevention (NACP) of Ukraine has been including JTI in its International Sponsors of War list since 2023. According to NACP, in 2021 only, JTI contributed at least US$3.6 billion directly to the Russian budget (1% of the total revenue of the Russian federal state budget). JTI was removed from NACP list in July 2024, but as of 2025, it operates 4 factories in Russia, including two raw-tobacco processing plants, and its Russian subsidiary remains under sanctions of National Security and Defense Council of Ukraine.

== Philanthropy ==
Japan Tobacco International is a silver patron of the University of Latvia Foundation. It has supported the university since 2010 by donating to long-term projects of the University of Latvia Senior Association.

Through the JTI foundation, the company sponsors humanitarian projects around the world. Projects include water purification, disaster recovery, mine clearing in Ukraine, and academic scholarships.

== Brands ==
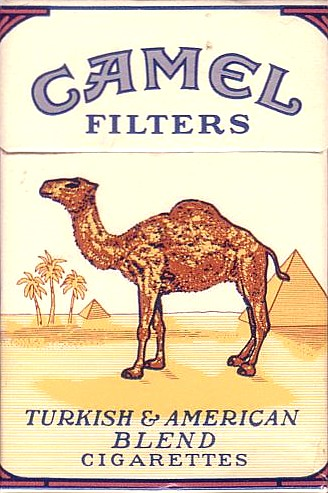
Camel Filters box

=== Flagship brands ===
These brands account for 72% of JTI's sales:

- Benson & Hedges
- Camel (outside the US)
- Glamour
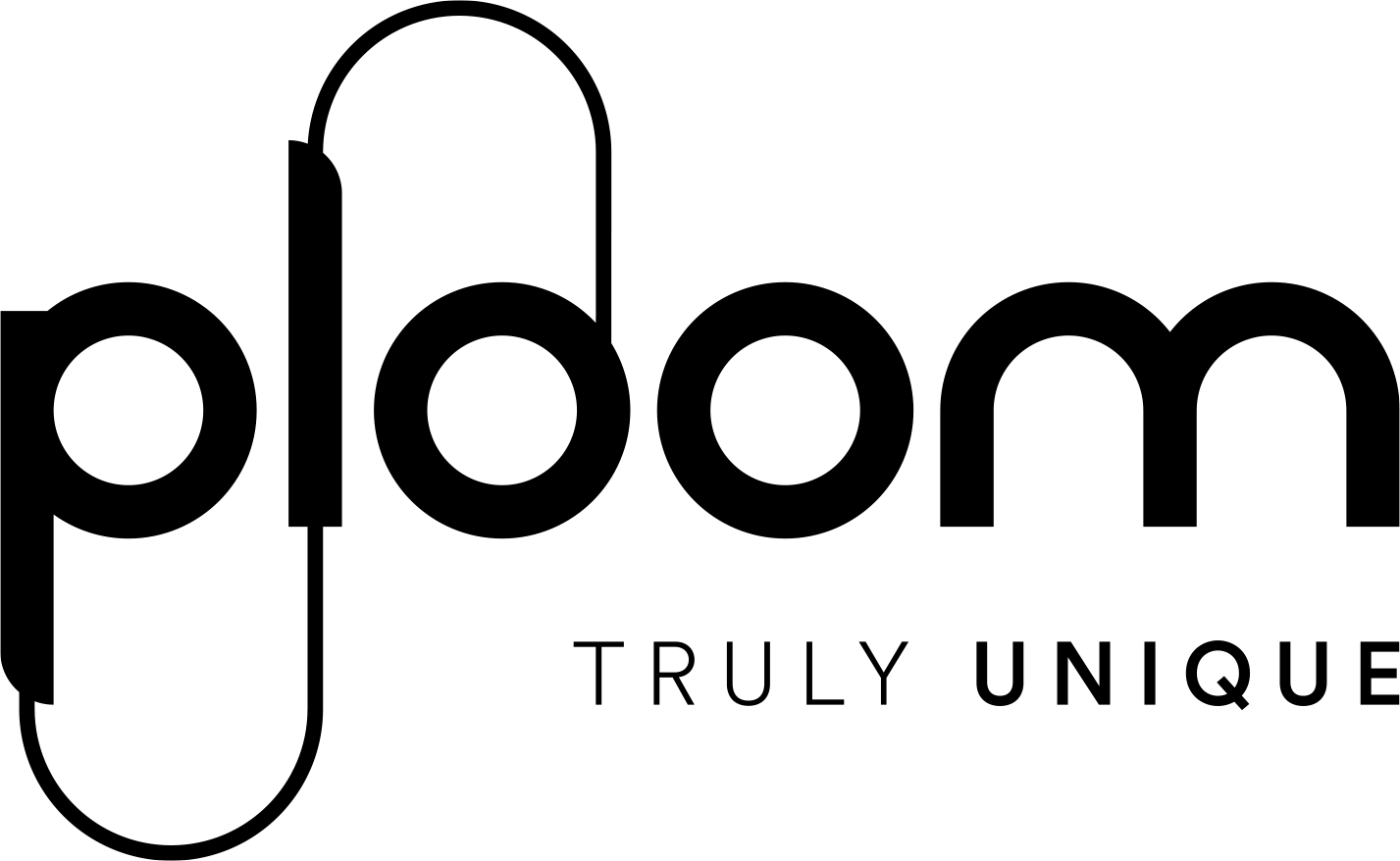
- JTI's heated tobacco device, Ploom
  LD
- Mevius (Mild Seven)
- Natural American Spirit (outside the US)
- EVO
  Winston is the second most purchased cigarette in the world.
  Silk Cut
- Sobranie
- Winston (outside the US)
- Ploom Aura (heated tobacco)
- Nordic Spirit (nicotine pouch)
- Logic (electronic cigarette)

=== Other tobacco products ===
- Hamlet
- Old Holborn
- Amber Leaf
- Gustavus Snus
- Wings

=== Other brands ===
JTI also has a portfolio of cigarette brands that the company markets regionally, including Export in Canada.
