= American Journal of Health Behavior =

- Discipline: Medical sociology
- Language: English
- Edited by: Elbert D. Glover

Publication details
- History: 1977-present
- Publisher: PNG Publications and Scientific Research Limited
- Open access: Hybrid
- Impact factor: 2.006 (2021)

Standard abbreviations
- ISO 4: Am. J. Health Behav.

Indexing
- ISSN: 1087-3244 (print); 1945-7359 (web)
- LCCN: 96648169
- OCLC no.: 1078058438

Links
- Journal homepage

The American Journal of Health Behavior is a peer-reviewed academic journal published by PNG Publications and Scientific Research Limited. It covers the study of individual and social efforts on health behaviors. The editor-in-chief is Juhnyong (Paul) Kim (University of Texas A&M).

== Abstracting and indexing ==
The journal is abstracted and indexed in the Social Sciences Citation Index and Scopus. According to the Journal Citation Reports, the journal has a 2021 impact factor of 2.006.

== History ==
In 1977, Slack Incorporated (Thorofare, New Jersey) first published Health Values. In 1989, Elbert D. Glover acquired Health Values from Slack. Using his wife's initials, he named the new publisher PNG Publications. Seven years later, in 1996, Glover renamed the journal to its current title. He was the owner, editor-in-chief and publisher from 1989 till 2021 when he sold the journal to JCFCorp (Singapore). As part of their enterprise, the new publisher choose to retain the original publisher name, but slightly changed to "PNG Publications and Scientific Research Limited" (London).

== Controversy ==
In exchange for a $51,000 fee, the 2021 May/June issue of the journal was made available open access and dedicated to studies funded by e-cigarette company Juul that provided results favoring Juul. $6,500 of the $51,000 fee was designated towards opening these files to the public. All of the studies' co-authors were found to be current or former Juul employees or to be affiliated to or under contract with Juul. The article suggested that switching from Juul from cigarettes is a positive choice for people that smoke, as well as promoting the use of cigarettes and Juul simultaneously. The President for the organization Tobacco-Free Kids, Matthew Myers stressed that research released by tobacco companies cannot be trusted, as he believed that the experiments done by tobacco companies are designed to produce outcomes that will align with the goals of the company, and not in the best interest of people, nor produce unbiased information for the public to use.
