= Export (cigarette) =

Canadian cigarette and rolling tobacco brand

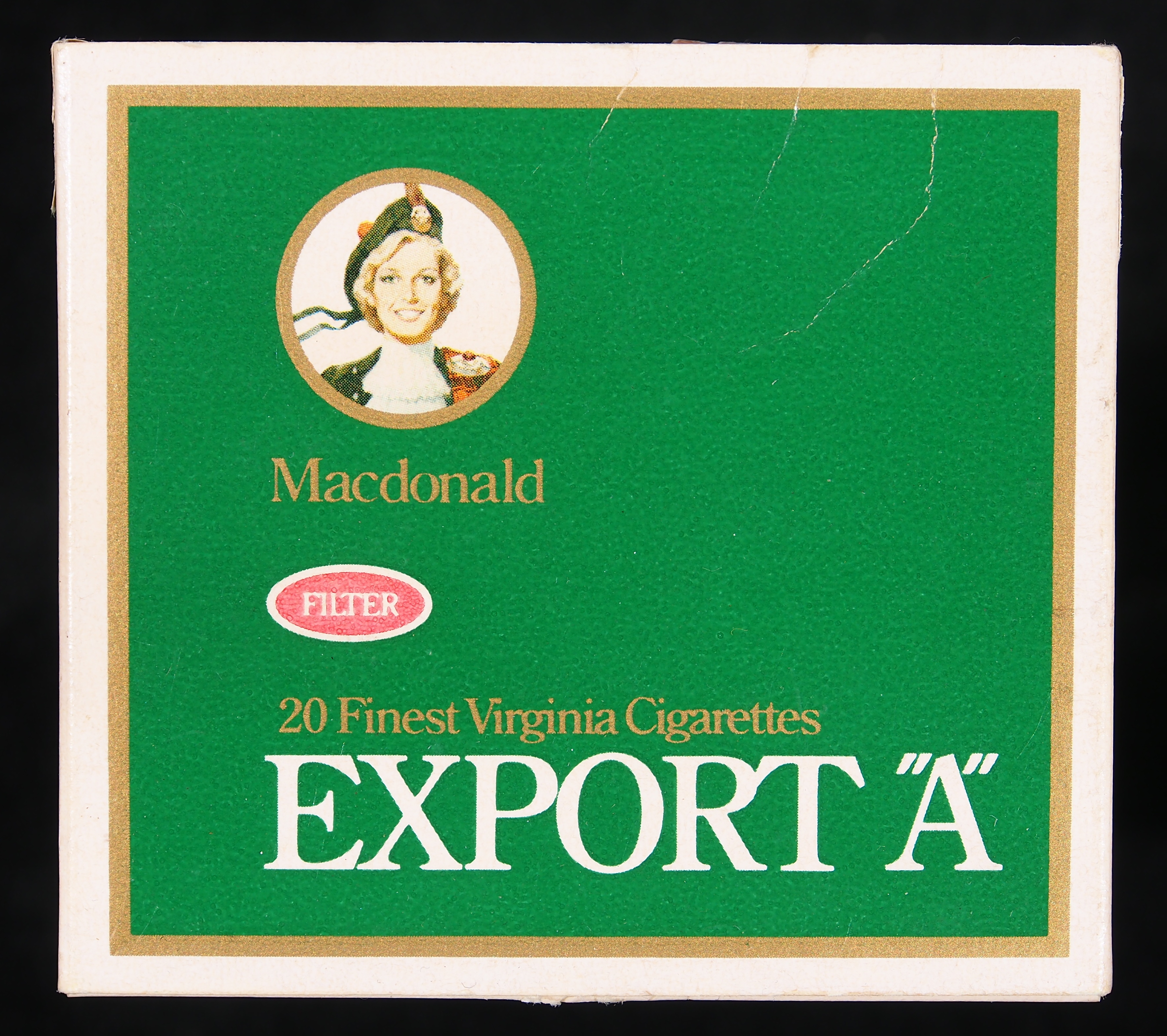
- An old Canadian pack of Export A cigarettes
- Product type: Cigarette
- Current owner: JTI Macdonald, a Canadian subsidiary of Japan Tobacco International
- Produced by: JTI Macdonald, a Canadian subsidiary of Japan Tobacco International
- Country: Canada
- Introduced: 1928; 98 years ago
- Markets: See Markets
- Previous owners: Macdonald Tobacco
- Tagline: "Go Your Own Way", "Be different"

Export is a Canadian brand of cigarettes and rolling tobacco, currently owned and manufactured by JTI Macdonald, a subsidiary of Japan Tobacco International.

== History ==
It was introduced in 1928 by Macdonald Tobacco as Macdonald's Gold Standard, the boxes were marked "Export", and they quickly became known under that name. The most recognized products are the Export 'A' product line, but JTI also produces an unfiltered 'Export Plain' cigarette and Export rolling tobacco. The cigarettes and rolling tobacco are from premium Virginia leaf tobacco.

Beginning in the mid-1930s, Macdonald's cigarette brands were adorned by the portrait of a pretty Scottish woman dressed in traditional garb and wearing the Macdonald of Sleat tartan. The model for this trademark was Betty Annan Grant, who posed for the painting by famous Canadian artist Rex Woods. The Scottish Lassie, as she is known, was featured on nearly all of Macdonald's cigarette brands until the 1970s and remained on packages of Export 'A' cigarettes to the present.

During World War II, a special duty-free variant of the Macdonald Gold Standard was made for the Canadian troops to boost general morale during their battles. On the slide cover was printed, "GIFT to Canadian troops on active service, not for re-sale. These cigarettes have not borne United Kingdom Customs Duty".

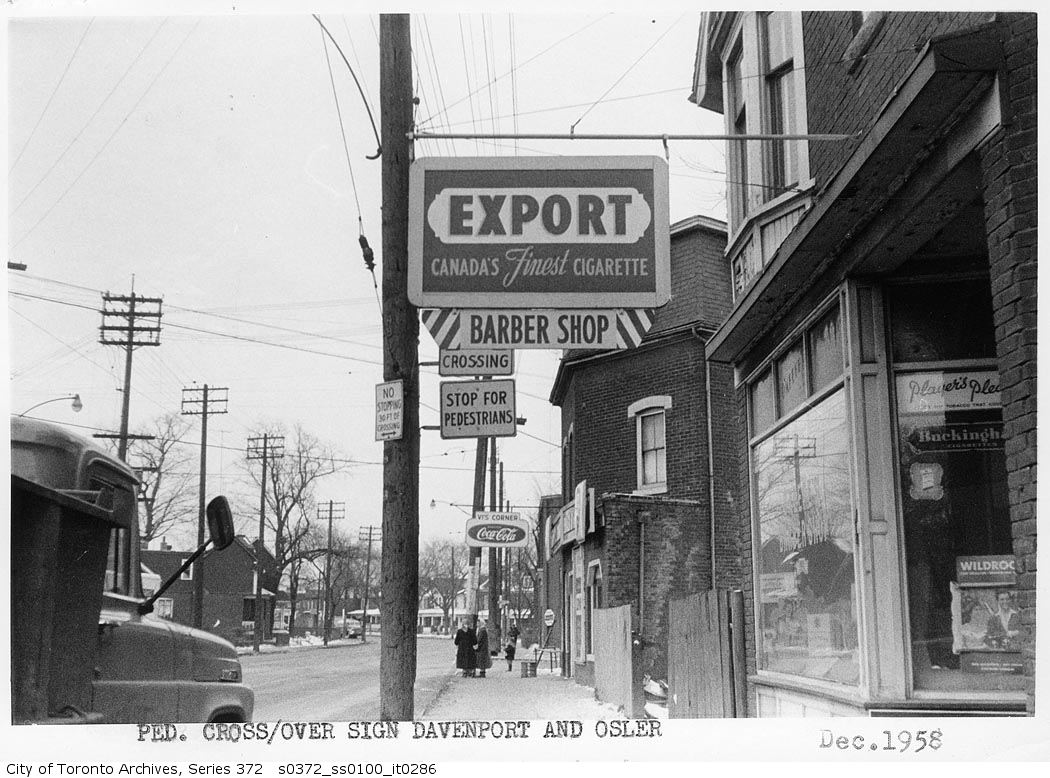
An advertisement for Export cigarettes in Toronto, c. 1958

== Advertisement ==
Macdonald Tobacco and JTI Macdonald have made many advertising posters over the years to promote the Macdonald Gold Standard and Export cigarettes, both in French and English. Various accessories were also made, such as a snapback, a cigarette lighter, stickers, playing cards, cufflinks, rubber coin mats, and beer mats.

In the 1990s, when Export sponsored various extreme sports, special advertisement billboards and posters were made to promote the Export 'A' variant.

Some of the slogans used were "Go Your Own Way" (used when advertising various extreme sports in Canada in the 1990s) and "Be Different".

== Sport sponsorship ==
From 1927 to 1979, Macdonald Tobacco sponsored the Canadian Men's Curling Championship, known in those years as the Macdonald Brier.

Export A was the main sponsor of various extreme sports, such as the 1998 UCI Mountain Bike World Championships (called the "Export A Mountain Bike World Cup"), the Niagara Motocross event, the Extreme Motorboat event, and the UCI Wildwater Kayak Race in Canada.

== Markets ==
Export and Macdonald's are mainly sold in Canada. They also were, or still are, sold in the United Kingdom, the Netherlands, and Hungary.

== Products ==
- Export A Plain/Full Flavor (unfiltered/filter, green)
- Export A Medium (dark blue)
- Export A Mild/Rich (red)
- Export A Smooth (gold)
- Export A Extra Smooth (silver)
- Export A Fine (light blue)
- Export A Activate (blue with capsule)

== See also ==
- Tobacco smoking
