= Elbert Glover =

American researcher and author

Elbert D. Glover
- Born: 1945 (age 80–81); Kingsville, Texas, U.S.
- Education: Texas Tech University, Texas A&M–Kingsville, Texas Woman's University
- Occupations: Public health researcher, editor
- Known for: Tobacco cessation research, founding editor of American Journal of Health Behavior

Elbert D. Glover (born May 14, 1946) is an American researcher and author in the field of tobacco addiction and smoking cessation. He retired as professor emeritus at the University of Maryland at College Park School of Public Health where he served as Chairperson of the Department of Behavioral and Community Health from 2005 to his retirement in 2015. He has worked as an entrepreneur, editor, and publisher, and was involved in the founding and management of the journals Health Behavior and Policy Review, American Journal of Health Behavior, and Tobacco Regulatory Science. Glover was also one of the founders of the American Academy of Health Behavior and served as its first president from 1997 to 2001.

== Early life and education ==
Glover was born at the Kingsville Naval Base in Kingsville, Texas, in 1945, where his father was stationed in the U.S. Navy. He graduated from Roy Miller High School in Corpus Christi, Texas in 1963 and attended Texas Tech University on a football scholarship, graduating in 1969. He earned a master's degree from Texas A&M Kingsville in 1972, and a PhD in health education from Texas Woman's University in 1977.

== Career ==
Glover held teaching and administrative positions at several institutions, including visiting assistant professor at Texas A&M University (1975–1976), assistant professor at the University of Kansas (1976–1978) and Texas Christian University (1978–1982), and associate professor and chair at Oklahoma State University (1982–1983). He became associate professor at East Carolina University (1985–1988), where he was later promoted to professor. He also served as professor at Pennsylvania State University (1988–1990), and held a faculty role in behavioral medicine and psychiatry at West Virginia University School of Medicine (1990–2005), where he directed the Tobacco Research Center. At the University of Maryland School of Public Health, he served as professor and department chair (2005–2015), founded the Center for Health Behavior Research, and retired in 2015 as professor emeritus.

== Research ==
Glover's research initially focused on smokeless tobacco; however, his primary research interest progressed to the development and testing of pharmacological cessation aids for smokers interested in stopping the addiction of tobacco. He conducted clinical trials with the use of all delivery forms of nicotine available on the US and European markets, to include nicotine gum, transdermal patches, oral nicotine inhalers, nasal spray, and sublingual tablets. Glover also conducted trials with bupropion (Zyban, a monocyclic antidepressant) and varenicline (Chantix, a nicotine receptor and partial agonist) which resulted in both being approved for use in the US. In addition, he studied the use of lobeline as a nicotine blocker, and various psychoactive substances including anti-depressants and anti-anxiety agents. He also investigated rimonabant (a cannabinoid receptor inverse agonist), and 3′AmNic-rEPA (a nicotine conjugate vaccine) as smoking cessation aids.

He received research grants from the government U.S. Department of Education, Centers for Disease Control, National Cancer Institute, National Institute of Drug Abuse, and National Institutes of Health. Also, received grants from the manufacturers of smoking cessation aids and conducted various pharmaceutical testing for many companies.

== Professional accomplishments ==
Glover has authored or co-authored 146 peer-reviewed articles and an additional 63 professional publications from 1976 to 2021 and received approximately $33 million in grant funding. He has delivered over 550 invited medical grand rounds/workshops on the subject to physicians and presented 335 national and international professional presentations to various medical and health professional organizations.

Glover was owner, publisher and editor of the American Journal of Health Behavior, Health Behavior and Policy Review and Tobacco Regulatory Science. In 2020, he sold his major portion of Health Behavior and Policy Review and in 2021 sold the American Journal of Health Behavior and Tobacco Regulatory Science. He was the founder (1997) and first president (1997–2001), of the American Academy of Health Behavior where he was named Fellow (1998), Research Laureate (2008) and awarded the Lifetime Achievement Award (2000) by the academy. He was selected as fellow of the American School Health Association & the Royal Institute of Public Health. He was elected Fellow (1991) and received the Distinguished Scholar Award from the American Association of Health Education (2003). Moreover, he received the AAHPERD Alliance Scholar Award being only the 4th health educator in its history to receive this award (2005).

== Public work ==
Glover's work appeared or featured on many television programs, including Dateline, 20/20, The Charlie Rose Show, Good Morning America, PM Magazine, Health Talk America, MD-TV, CBS Morning News, Peter Jennings News World Report, and NBC Evening News. His research has also been featured in numerous popular publications such as Ladies Home Journal, Newsweek, Reader's Digest, Seventeen, Time, and USA Today.

He served in various capacities primarily as reviewer and ad hoc reviewer for 20 key health academic journals and/or publications among these are the American Journal of Public Health, Addictive Behaviors, NCI Journal, Journal Clinical Advances in Smoking Cessation, Physician and Sports medicine, Medical Self-Care, Public Health Reports, American Journal of Health Education, Journal of School Health, Journal of Family Practice, Journal of Alcohol and Drug Education, Advances in Dental Research, Mayo Clinic Proceedings, Southern Medical Journal, Nicotine & Tobacco Research, Drug Discovery Today, and the Journal of the American Medical Association.

== Criticism and controversy ==
In May–June 2021, the American Journal of Health Behavior published a controversial "Special Issue on JUUL", funded entirely by JUUL Labs. Critics noted that reviewers were not informed of the funding source during peer review, raising concerns of transparency and bias. Glover, the editor, later acknowledged the omission and stated he did not consider it a conflict. The practice of offering reviewers financial compensation and charging article authors significant publication fees also drew criticism. Three members of the editorial board resigned in protest. Glover defended the journal's vetting procedures but retired soon afterward, citing a cancer diagnosis.
