= Adam Bowen =

American businessman (born 1974/75)

- Born: 1974 or 1975 (age 51–52)
- Education: Pomona College; Stanford University
- Known for: Co-founder, Juul Labs
- Title: Chief technology officer, Juul Labs
- Spouse: Married
- Children: 3

Adam Bowen (born 1974/1975) is an American businessman, and the co-founder (with James Monsees) and currently advisor at Juul Labs, an electronic cigarette company.

== Education ==
Bowen earned a BA in physics from Pomona College, followed by an MS in product design from Stanford University.

== Career ==
Bowen and Monsees founded vaporizer company Pax Labs in 2007. Juul was spun off from Pax Labs in 2017. In December 2018, following tobacco company Altria taking a 35% stake in Juul, Bowen's net worth increased from an estimated $730 million to more than $1.1 billion. After subsequent write-downs of the value of Juul, Forbes no longer considers Bowen a billionaire as of 2020.

== Personal life ==
Bowen is married, with three children, and lives in San Mateo, California.
