= Center for Environmental Health =

American non-profit organization

The Center for Environmental Health (CEH) is an American non-profit organization (501(c)(3)) organization working to protect children and families from harmful chemicals in air, food, water and in everyday products. Its vision and mission are "(A) world where everyone lives, works, learns and plays in a healthy environment; we protect people from toxic chemicals by working with communities, businesses, and the government to demand and support business practices that are safe for human health and the environment." CEH is headquartered in Oakland, California, in the United States, with East Coast offices in Washington, D.C. and North Carolina.

== Early work ==
CEH was founded in 1996 by Michael Green, who previously worked for the U.S. Department of Energy. The group brings litigation under a California law, the Safe Drinking Water and Toxic Enforcement Act of 1986, which was enacted as a citizens' ballot proposition and is often referred to as the state's "Prop 65" law. Prop 65 requires companies to provide warnings when their products expose Californians to a chemical or chemicals that are known to cause cancer or serious reproductive health problems.

In one of its early legal cases, CEH tested 16 home water filters and found 6 that were leeching lead into filtered water, above California safety limits. CEH brought Prop 65 lawsuits against the 6 companies. One company withdrew one filter model from the market and offered customers who had purchased the product a refund.

Beginning in 2000, CEH joined by the California Attorney General, sued 34 companies that made playground equipment or picnic tables from wood treated with an arsenic-based preservative. Until 2003, most wood sold in the U.S. for outdoor use was treated with chromated copper arsenate (CCA), an arsenic-based preservative. By late 2001, three national manufacturers of children's backyard play sets agreed to a CEH legal settlement calling for them to stop using arsenic in pressure-treated lumber within three months. By 2003, all of the companies had agreed to stop selling arsenic-treated wood in California and nationwide.

In addition to legal work, early on CEH was involved in support of groups fighting for environmental justice. In 1999-2001, CEH collaborated with local environmental justice community groups working to close East Oakland's Integrated Environmental Systems (IES) medical waste incinerator. The incinerator was considered an environmental justice issue, because it burned waste from all over California and released the toxic byproducts mainly into an African-American and Latino community. The IES incinerator, the last medical waste incinerator operating in California, was closed in December 2001.

== Lead in children's products ==
In 1999, CEH filed suit against pharmaceutical companies and retailers, including Bristol-Myers Squibb Co., Johnson & Johnson, Pfizer, Rite Aid Corp., Safeway, Walgreens and others for sales of baby powders that the group alleged contained harmful levels of lead. The suit noted that the baby powders contained zinc oxide, which can contain lead, and that babies can be exposed if they inhale the compounds, and/or can absorb them through irritated skin, and/or could ingest them if they get the powder on their hands or mouth. Ultimately, several manufacturers agreed to significant reductions in the lead in the products, up to 80% less for the products that had tested highest for lead. In a similar suit, CEH and the California Attorney General sued makers of Kaopectate for high lead content in its products; the company agreed to reduce the levels of lead in its children's Kaopectate by 95%, and by 80% in its adult variety.

In 2004, CEH and other groups filed lawsuits against manufacturers and distributors of Mexican candies. In 2006, the California Attorney General, along with CEH and the Environmental Health Coalition reached a legal settlement with the companies, including subsidiaries of Mars and Hershey, calling for the companies to reduce the lead levels in their products.

Later in 2004, CEH again joined the Attorney General in a lawsuit against companies, including popular mall stores such as Claire's Boutique, Hot Topic and Zumiez, and department stores such as Target, Macy's and Nordstrom, that sold costume jewelry marketed to children, teens and adult containing high levels of lead. In 2006, seventy-one companies, including Target, Kmart, Macy's, Nordstrom, Sears, Disney Stores and others, agreed to a legal settlement with the Attorney General and CEH that created the nation's first legally binding standards for lead in jewelry.

In 2007, CEH testing found high levels of lead in a Curious George doll and other toys, leading to the organization's lawsuit against Marvel and other companies, including Toys R Us Inc., Wal-Mart, Sears, Kmart, K-B Toys, Target, Costco, and others for selling toys containing lead. At the time, there was no federal law limiting lead in children's products, other than for paint on products. In 2008, CEH leveraged the California Prop 65 law to help win passage of the federal Consumer Product Safety Improvement Act, designed to establish the first-ever comprehensive federal lead safety standards for children's products.

== Purses, cola, flame retardants, fracking and avgas (2009-2015) ==
In 2009, CEH filed a lawsuit after tests showed high lead levels in purses sold by 16 retailers. By 2010, the group had tested purses from 100 top retailers, finding many with high lead levels. In June of that year, CEH reached a legal settlement with more than 40 companies who agreed to stop selling items containing lead in excess of safety levels. But ABC World News reported in 2012 that even after signing legal agreements to meet the lead limits, some companies continued to sell lead-containing purses. Their report says that CEH testing found 43 of the 300 purses tested with lead. In 2013, The New York Times reported that the group found a steady reduction in lead contamination from accessories over all, but continued to find lead contamination in some fashion accessories sold to budget-conscious teenagers and young women at some retailers.

Cola companies, including PepsiCo and Coca-Cola, were reportedly using caramel coloring for their colas that contain a carcinogenic chemical called 4-MEI. The companies pledged to switch to a reformulated coloring without 4-MEI, but NPR reported in 2013 that CEH testing found 10 Pepsi products bought outside of California still contained high levels of the chemical, while 9 of ten Coke products contained just trace levels or no 4-MEI. In 2015, CEH reached a legal agreement with Pepsi requiring the company to limit the levels of 4-MEI in its products sold in California to no more than 100 parts per billion. In the legal settlement, Pepsi asserted it had been compliant with California regulations all along.

After California listed the flame retardant TDCPP (chlorinated Tris) as a cancer-causing chemical, testing commissioned by CEH found 15 baby and children's products containing high levels of the chemical, above the state safety standard. In 2012, the group brought legal action against companies selling the products, including Walmart, Babies-R-Us, Target, and others. The following year, CEH filed suit against companies for selling children's nap mats that contained the chemical. In 2014, CEH reached a legal settlement with 14 companies, calling for the companies to discontinue sales of certain products containing the chemical or provide warning labels. It also called for future products to be made without TDCPP and other flame retardants. CEH also co-sponsored California legislation to require furniture makers to disclose whether furniture sold in California contains flame-retardant chemicals. The bill was signed into law in September 2014. By December 2014 story, companies including Facebook, Kaiser Permanente, Staples and others signed a CEH pledge to stop purchasing furniture treated with flame-retardant chemicals. The companies and government entities signing the pledge reportedly spend a combined $520 million on furniture every year.

An October 2014 study co-authored by CEH's Research Director Caroline Cox found levels of eight volatile chemicals in air samples around fracking sites exceeded federal air pollution guidelines in some circumstances. In December, another study, whose lead author Ellen Webb works for CEH, found potential developmental and reproductive health problems for women and children living near fracking sites.

Due to lead pollution risks, the use of leaded auto gas began to be phased out in the mid-1970s. But most small airplanes, including piston-engine aircraft and some smaller jets, still run on leaded fuel, known as "avgas". In December 2014, CEH reached legal agreements with 26 avgas providers in California requiring them to not use or sell gasoline with a lead content greater than 0.56 grams per liter, which is significantly lower than many fuel mixes. The settlement called on the companies to sell avgas "with the lowest concentration of lead approved for aviation use that is commercially available", and required them to post warning signs around airports.

== E-cigarettes, chemical policy reform, BPA (2015-2016) ==
In February 2015, CEH sent legal notices to nearly 40 companies it alleged were selling e-cigarettes without warning labels, as required by California law. In September of that year, the group released a report showing that the majority of the 97 e-cigarette products it tested could expose users to one or both of the cancer-causing chemicals formaldehyde and acetaldehyde. A test on one e-cigarette found the level of formaldehyde was more than 470 times higher than the California safety standard.

The "vaping" products tested by CEH were produced by leading tobacco companies including RJ Reynolds, ITG Brands and NJOY and were purchased from major retailers including RiteAid, 7-Eleven and other outlets between February and July 2015. Almost 90% of the companies whose products were tested (21 of 24 companies) had one or more products that produced hazardous amounts of one or both of the chemicals, in violation of California law. The testing found high levels of the chemicals even in some nicotine-free e-cigarette varieties. CEH launched legal actions against more than 60 companies for failing to warn consumers about exposure from e-cigarettes to nicotine and/or to formaldehyde and acetaldehyde, as required by California law. In one legal settlement with CEH, the e-cigarette company Sapphire Vapor agreed to legally binding restrictions on sales and marketing to teens and prohibitions on the use of unverified health claims in their marketing.

CEH has long worked for strong federal rules to protect children and families from harmful chemicals. In March 2015, as Congress was developing new federal rules for regulating toxic chemicals, CEH and other health and environmental advocacy groups criticized the proposed bill for falling far short of what's needed to protect the public from hazardous chemicals. In an opinion article, CEH's Michael Green (with co-author Christopher Gavigan) stated that the bill co-authored by Senator Tom Udall "would roll back hundreds of state laws, replacing them with a weaker federal rule that could put Americans at risk from toxics in our air, water, food and every day products for years to come." After the bill was signed by President Obama in June 2016, CEH's Ansje Miller criticized the "incredibly slow" timeline for assessing potentially harmful chemicals under the legislation, but noted that the bill allowed states to continue some chemical regulation, including under California's Proposition 65 law.

In March 2016, California regulators proposed an exception to the Proposition 65 law for canned foods that could expose consumers to the toxic chemical bisphenol A (BPA). The state argued that the warning labels on cans could confuse consumers and cause poor people to eat fewer fruits and vegetables. But CEH and other groups opposed the proposal, with a CEH spokesman warning that "[T]he proposal will make things worse for poor people because they'll be denied the right to know what's in their food." When the state's proposal went forward, CEH's Caroline Cox noted that the exception to Prop 65 could weaken the law going forward. When the state proposed extending the exception, an opinion piece by CEH's Michael Green (co-authored with Sam Mogannam) stated that "It is time for consumers to join health advocates and responsible businesses to demand that this unprecedented and irresponsible policy not go forward."

== Awards and recognition ==
In 2007, CEH Chief Executive Officer Michael Green was granted the Compassion in Action award by the Missing Peace project, a joint project of the Committee of 100 for Tibet and the Dalai Lama Foundation. In 2010, CEH was awarded a "Green Champion" by the San Francisco Business Times.
