= Nicotine salt =

Identifiers
CAS Number	benzoate: 88660-53-1; sulfate: 65-30-5; hydrochloride: 2820-51-1
3D model (JSmol)	benzoate: Interactive image; sulfate: Interactive image; hydrochloride: Interactive image
ChEBI	sulfate: CHEBI:232650
ChEMBL	sulfate: ChEMBL3182465; hydrochloride: ChEMBL225057
ChemSpider	benzoate: 128935046; sulfate: 2016814; hydrochloride: 4447498
EC Number	sulfate: 200-606-7
PubChem CID	benzoate: 117701601; sulfate: 2735101; hydrochloride: 5284430
RTECS number	sulfate: QS9625000
UNII	sulfate: UX4GTH155W; hydrochloride: V403GH89L1
UN number	1658 3445 (sulfate) 1656 3444 (hydrochloride)
CompTox Dashboard (EPA)	benzoate: DTXSID001337072; hydrochloride: DTXSID40943922
- InChI: Key: HDJBTCAJIMNXEW-PPHPATTJSA-N; benzoate: InChI=1S/C10H14N2.C7H6O2/c1-12-7-3-5-10(12)9-4-2-6-11-8-9;8-7(9)6-4-2-1-3-5-6/h2,4,6,8,10H,3,5,7H2,1H3;1-5H,(H,8,9)/t10-;/m0./s1 Key: VAUQRLHPXWYZRZ-PPHPATTJSA-N; sulfate: InChI=1S/2C10H14N2.H2O4S/c2*1-12-7-3-5-10(12)9-4-2-6-11-8-9;1-5(2,3)4/h2*2,4,6,8,10H,3,5,7H2,1H3;(H2,1,2,3,4)/t2*10-;/m00./s1 Key: IECQULMJVNSKDB-RCWTXCDDSA-N; hydrochloride: InChI=1S/C10H14N2.ClH/c1-12-7-3-5-10(12)9-4-2-6-11-8-9;/h2,4,6,8,10H,3,5,7H2,1H3;1H/t10-;/m0./s1
- SMILES: benzoate: CN1CCC[C@H]1C2=CN=CC=C2.C1=CC=C(C=C1)C(=O)O; sulfate: CN1CCC[C@H]1C2=CN=CC=C2.CN1CCC[C@H]1C2=CN=CC=C2.OS(=O)(=O)O; hydrochloride: CN1CCC[C@H]1C2=CN=CC=C2.Cl
- Except where otherwise noted, data are given for materials in their standard state (at 25 °C [77 °F], 100 kPa). Infobox references

Nicotine salts are salts formed from nicotine and an acid. They are found naturally in tobacco leaves. Various acids can be used, leading to different conjugate bases paired with the ammonium form of nicotine.

== Research ==
Research on nicotine salts is limited. Possible health risks of persistent inhalation of high levels of nicotine salts are not fully known. "Juul products use nicotine salts, which can lead to much more available nicotine," Principal Deputy Director Dr. Anne Schuchat of the Centers for Disease Control and Prevention (CDC) stated in September 2019. She also stated that the nicotine salts "cross the blood brain barrier and lead to potentially more effect on the developing brain in adolescents."

A 2025 study on adolescent nicotine exposure from smoking tobacco and vaping showed that nicotine salt products were associated with higher nicotine exposure, which is consistent with previous findings that nicotine salt e-cigarettes are linked to a higher rate of dependency.

== Types ==
A nicotine base and a weak acid such as benzoic acid or levulinic acid is used to form a nicotine salt. Across a sample of 23 nicotine salts available for public purchase, the three most common acids used in the formation of nicotine salts were lactic acid, benzoic acid and levulinic acid. Benzoic acid is the most used acid to create a nicotine salt. Nicotine pyruvate is another form of nicotine salt. A chemical reaction with a pyruvic acid is used to aerosolize nicotine.

== Level and rate of delivery ==
A free-base nicotine solution with an acid reduces the pH, which makes it possible to provide higher levels of nicotine without irritating the throat. Nicotine salts are thought to amplify the level and rate of nicotine delivery to the user. The speed of nicotine salts uptake into the body with the use of electronic cigarettes is close to the speed of nicotine uptake from traditional cigarettes. Traditional cigarettes provide high levels of nicotine, but with the taste of tobacco and paper smoke which many may find undesirable. Pod mods, however, can provide high levels of nicotine without the negative smoking experience.

Nicotine salts are less harsh and less bitter and as a consequence e-liquids that contain nicotine salts are more tolerable even with high nicotine concentrations. Nicotine salts in aerosol form do not generally generate the sensation of irritation in the chest and lungs that regular cigarettes do. Protonated nicotine salt is easier for less experienced users to inhale. This smoother experience of nicotine delivery into the body makes nicotine salts popular amongst those new to vaping e-liquids and those seeking a nicotine replacement therapy that is more commensurate to smoking traditional cigarettes.

As of 2023, many manufacturers in the United Kingdom have been observed to have shifted to nicotine salt-only disposable pods, after previously offering a majority of products in conventional liquids containing freebase nicotine. This is widely seen as being due to nicotine salt's more addictive nature. Nicotine salts' more addictive nature has also seen an increase in the uptake of vaping by children.

In 2024, concerns for the use of acidic additives to form nicotine salts were also expressed after a clinical study concluded that the nicotine intake from salt-based nicotine was significantly higher.

== Brands ==
The latest generation of e-cigarettes, "pod products," such as Juul, have the highest nicotine content (50 mg/mL), in protonated salt, rather than the free-base nicotine form found in earlier generations. In June 2015, Juul introduced a pod mod device containing nicotine salt. British American Tobacco stated that they have been using nicotine salts in their US Vuse e-liquid brand since 2012.

There has been a proliferation of pod-based products with high nicotine concentration, triggered by Juul's financial success. As of September 2018, there were no less than 39 similar Juul devices as well as 15 Juul-compatible pods being offered. Tested show that the pod mods Juul, Bo, Phix, and Suorin contain nicotine salts in a solution with propylene glycol and glycerin.

Nicotine Salt vaping devices are also available in disposable form, multiple brands exist and since their popularity is rising, many new brands of disposable nicotine salt devices are coming to the market. In the United Kingdom, the maximum nicotine concentration allowed by law is 20mg/ml.

== Marketing ==
Advertisements state nicotine salt liquids contain 2 to 10 times more nicotine than those found in the majority of regular e-cigarette products. Most e-cigarette products are marketed as containing nicotine, only 10.1% of the market proportion of products specified that it contains nicotine salt.
