= Logic (electronic cigarette) =

Electronic cigarette brand

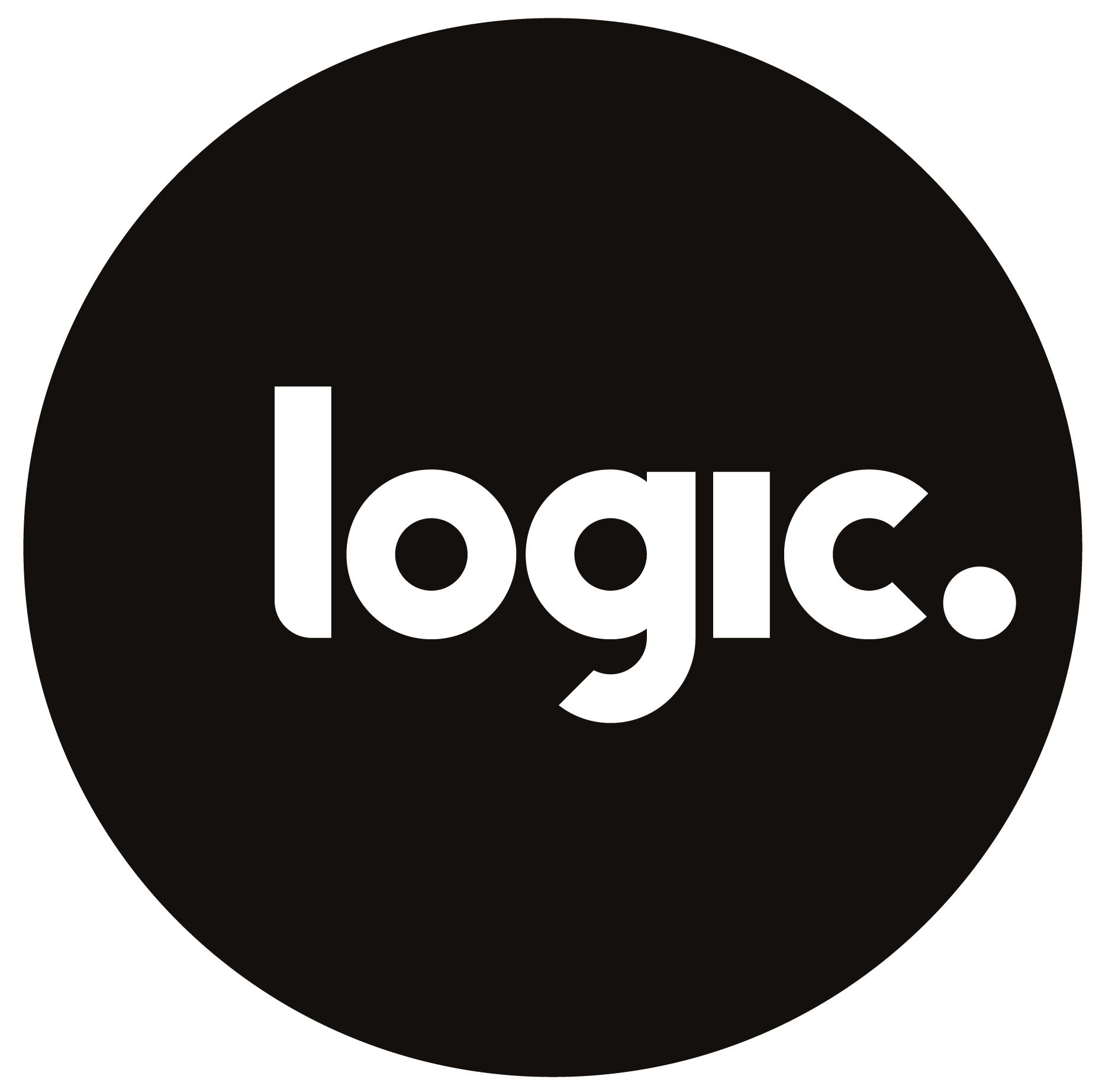
- Product type: Electronic cigarette
- Current owner: Japan Tobacco International
- Produced by: Logic Technology Development LLC
- Country: United States
- Introduced: 2011; 15 years ago
- Previous owners: Eli Alelov and Howard Panes
- Website: logicvapes.com

Logic (stylized as "logic.") is an electronic cigarette brand of Japan Tobacco International. Logic sells rechargeable and disposable e-cigarettes.

== History ==
Logic Technology Development was founded in 2010 by Eli Alelov and Howard Panes in Pompano Beach, Florida. Panes served as chief operating officer of the company. They launched their Logic e-cigarette device on their website in 2011. Nicotine is obtained from a polyethylene glycol or propolene glycol e-liquid solution, and other chemicals are included such as glycerin and flavorings. The end of the device turns blue when in use.

In 2014, Logic Technology Development cited Nielsen in saying that it was the number one e-cigarette company in the United States, although it has also been reported that it was second behind Blu eCigs. In April 2015, Japan Tobacco International (JTI) agreed to acquire Logic Technology Development. JTI subsequently also rebranded E-lites vapor products (another brand the company acquired before Logic) into Logic.

Logic products were mainly manufactured in China, although in 2018 JTI opened a factory in Poland for manufacturing Logic as well as the company's heated tobacco products.

In 2023, the Logic Compact and Logic Pro devices have been discontinued and replaced by a new Logic Vape. The new device has a technology that the company calls MOOV, which consists of device control through intuitive gestures as well as haptic feedback.

== Market share ==
In the first quarter of 2015, Logic Technology Development held a 20% market share in United States convenience stores. Logic held a 12.3% market share in the United States in 2016. It was also ranked number one in Ireland and number three in the UK.

By 2019, JTI were selling Logic in many countries such as France, Russia and Greece, and were actively expanding to new markets like Portugal, Kuwait and the UAE. However, its global market share fell by 2021.

== Marketing ==
In a 2013 review of Logic Premium, PCMag mentioned:

If Blu eCigs target the hipper, younger vaper market, then Logic appears to target an older, more sophisticated crowd. The black, shiny eCigs' appearance and very name suggest calm, cool reasoned "vaping"

== Regulation ==
In 2013, Logic's CEO Eli Alelov said that he is not claiming that Logic e-cigarettes are a "health product", but leave the judgment to the public considering it has no smoke or tar. As electronic cigs aren't taxed like regular cigs, Alevov said: "the states hate us, because they're losing money".

In March 2021, JTI was forced to stop selling Logic products online in the United States following Congress passing the bill banning USPS from delivering vapor products.

In October 2022, the Food and Drug Administration (FDA) issued marketing denial orders to two Logic menthol flavored products, the first time it had done so against a menthol e-cigarette.
