= James Monsees =

American businessman

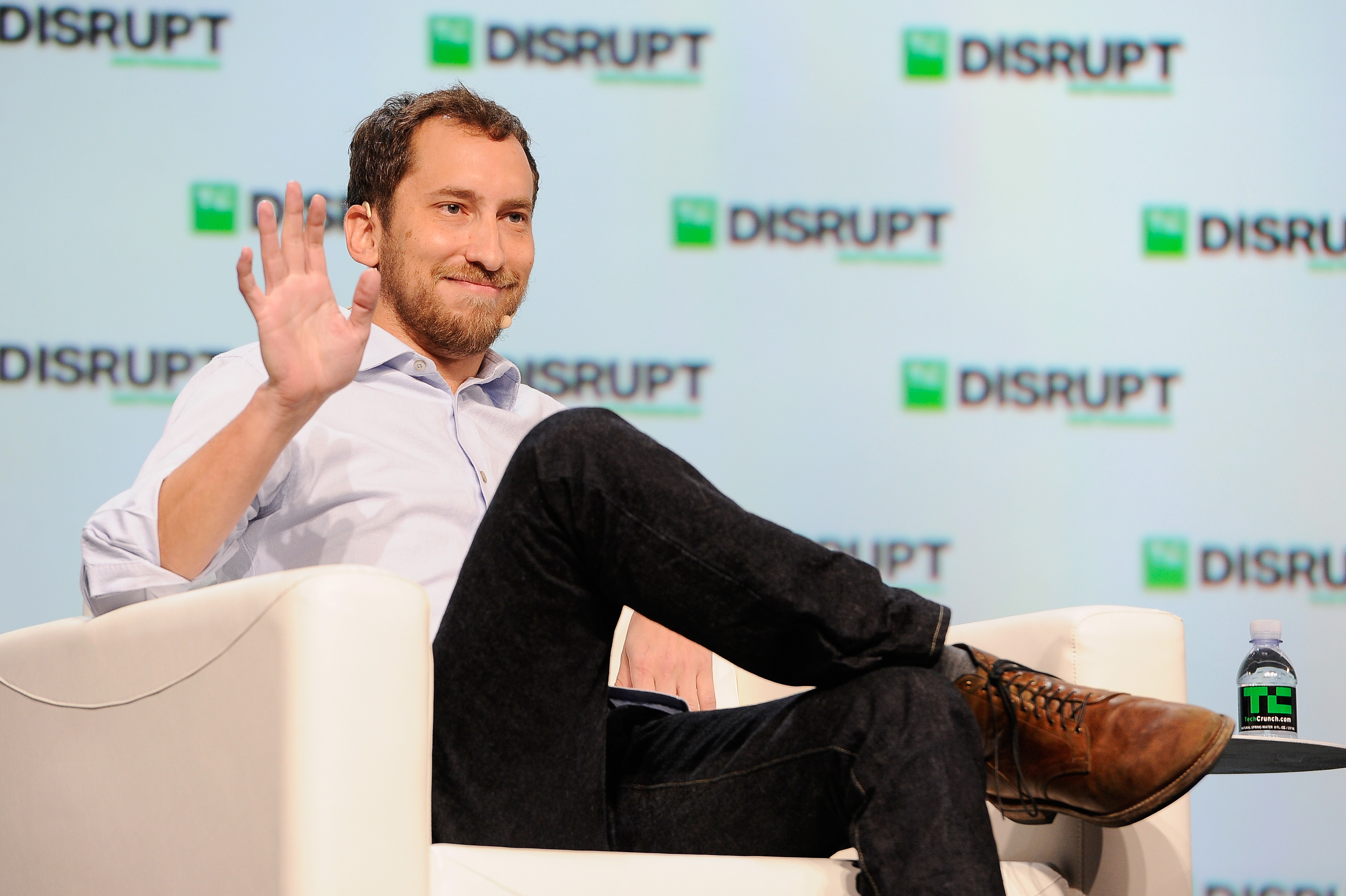
- Monsees in 2018
- Education: Kenyon College; Stanford University
- Known for: Co-founder, Juul Labs
- Title: Chief product officer, Juul

James Monsees is an American businessman, and the co-founder (with Adam Bowen) and former chief product officer of Juul Labs, an electronic cigarette company.

== Early life and education ==
Monsees is an alumnus of Whitfield School in St. Louis, Missouri.

Monsees earned a BA in Physics and Studio Art from Kenyon College, followed by an MS in Product Design from Stanford University.

== Career ==
In December 2018, following Altria taking a 35% stake in Juul, Monsees's net worth increased from an estimated $730 million to more than $1.1 billion. After subsequent write-downs of the value of Juul, Forbes no longer considers Monsees a billionaire.

In March 2020, Monsees announced to his employees that he is stepping down as adviser and board member of Juul.
