= Composition of heated tobacco product emissions =

The composition of the emissions generated from heated tobacco products are generally lower than that found in cigarette smoke. This is due to the comparatively low temperatures, the filter systems, and physical design. The composition of what is produced is complex. The main toxicants found in the emissions of cigarette smoke (i.e., tar, nicotine, carbonyl compounds, and nitrosamines) are also found in the emissions of these products in varying concentrations. The aerosol generated contains levels of nicotine and cancer-causing chemicals; however, available evidence indicates emissions generally contain lower levels of some harmful constituents than cigarette smoke but does not mean that the products are safe. The emissions contained 84% of the nicotine found in regular cigarettes.

The available research on the mainstream and exhaled aerosol generated by these products is limited, as of 2018. Which is why reviews and public health agencies still note uncertainty about long-term health effects and limited evidence on cessation outcomes. Heated tobacco products do not produce sidestream smoke from a burning tip, but they do generate emissions and exhaled aerosol that can expose bystanders to some of the same chemicals found in cigarette smoke, though typically at lower levels. The exhaled aerosol is highly volatile because it is made up of liquid particles that evaporate quickly. The particle size of their emissions have a median aerodynamic diameter that is somewhat bigger than those found in cigarette smoke. There is a lack of agreement on the composition of the emissions in the documented literature, as of 2018. These products, however, still pose health risks. Lower levels of harmful emissions has been shown, but lowering the risk to the smoker who transitions to using them has not been shown, as of 2018. As a result of the various types of heated tobacco products, the characteristics and effects for each type will be different.

Since the 1960s heated tobacco products were in development by tobacco companies. Safer heated tobacco products that deliver nicotine but limit emissions of tar or carbon monoxide (CO) is a half-century old idea, which had been unsuccessfully market-tested since 1988, first as Premier by the RJ Reynolds Tobacco Company (RJR) and later as Eclipse (RJR) and Accord Philip Morris International (PMI). Various heated products were reintroduced to the market, as of 2018.

== Introduction ==
Heated tobacco products are electronic devices that heat processed tobacco to supposedly deliver an aerosol with fewer toxicants than in cigarette smoke. Commercially available heated tobacco systems like glo (produced by British American Tobacco (BAT)) or IQOS (Philip Morris International (PMI)) include a charger, a holder and tobacco sticks, plugs or capsules. Inserted into the holder, tobacco sticks are heated with an electronically controlled heating element. Other products, like iFuse from BAT or Ploom Tech from Japan Tobacco (JT), produce aerosol from a non-tobacco source and pass it through a tobacco plug to absorb flavor and nicotine. Heated tobacco products aim for a niche between combustible tobacco smoking and electronic cigarettes that aerosolize nicotine suspended in humectants.

Since the 1960s heated tobacco products were in development by tobacco companies. Safer heated tobacco products that deliver nicotine but limit emissions of tar or carbon monoxide (CO) is a half-century-old idea, which had been unsuccessfully market-tested since 1988, first as Premier by the RJ Reynolds Tobacco Company (RJR) and later as Eclipse (RJR) and Accord (PMI). As of 2018, various heated tobacco products were reintroduced to the market. Japan, where manufacturers have marketed several heated tobacco brands since 2014, has been the focal national test market, with the intention of developing global marketing strategies. According to a 2018 report, the launching of the latest incarnation of heated tobacco products is a reiteration of similar efforts in the past to use similar products to undermine tobacco control, particularly efforts that present the tobacco industry as a harm reduction partner.

As of 2018, of the current heated tobacco products, IQOS was launched in several cities in Japan, Italy and Switzerland in 2014, iFuse was released in Romania in 2015 and glo and Ploom Tech were introduced to Japanese cities in 2016. Due to regulations restricting the sale of nicotine-containing e-cigarettes, Japan was a fertile market for heated tobacco producers, suggesting that the products have potential 'for explosive global growth'. By 2017, IQOS was available in 30 countries and was being considered by United States Food and Drug Administration for a reduced-risk product approval, and the UK was one of the first countries to assign a separate taxation category for heated tobacco products. In the United States, the FDA authorized the marketing of IQOS products via the premarket tobacco product application (PMTA) pathway in April 2019, while stating that the authorization did not mean the products were safe or 'FDA approved'.

== List of substances ==
Substances emitted exist as gases, liquid droplets, and particulate matter.

- Acenaphthene
- Acetaldehyde
- Acrylonitrile
- Acetone
- Acrolein
- Aerosol (vapor)
- Ammonia
- Aldehydes
- 1-Aminonaphthalene
- 2-Aminonaphthalene
- 4-Aminobiphenyl
- Benzine
- Benz(a)anthracene
- Benzo(a)pyrene
- 1,3-Butadiene
- Carbonyl compounds
- Carbon monoxide
- Cotinine
- Crotonaldehyde
- Ethylene oxide
- Flavorings
- Formaldehyde
- Glycerin
- Isoprene
- Menthol
- Nicotine
- Nicotine equivalents
- Nicotine derived agents
- Nitric oxide
- Nitrosamines
  - Nicotine-derived nitrosamine ketone
  - N-nitrosonornicotine
- Nitrogen oxides
- o-Toluidine
- Particulate metals
- Polycyclic aromatic hydrocarbon
- Pyrene
- Propylene glycol
- Propionaldehyde
- Solanesol
- Styrene
- Tar (The solids in the emissions have been called nicotine-free dry particulate matter rather than tar in papers written by people related to the tobacco industry.)
- Toluene
- Volatile organic compounds
- Water

== See also ==
- Composition of electronic cigarette aerosol
- List of heated tobacco products

== Bibliography ==
- McNeill, A; Brose, LS; Calder, R; Bauld, L; Robson, D (2018). "Evidence review of e-cigarettes and heated tobacco products 2018" (PDF). UK: Public Health England. pp. 1–243.
