= Peoria (disambiguation) =

Peoria is a city in Illinois, United States.

Peoria may also refer to:

== People ==
- Peoria people, an Indigenous people of the Northwestern Woodlands
- Peoria Tribe of Indians of Oklahoma, a federally recognized tribe in Oklahoma

== Places ==
=== United States ===
- Peoria, Arizona, largest city in the US with that name; named after Peoria, Illinois
- Peoria, Colorado
- Peoria, Franklin County, Indiana
- Peoria, Miami County, Indiana
- Peoria, Iowa
- Peoria, Kansas
- Peoria, Missouri
- Peoria, Ohio
- Peoria, Oklahoma
- Peoria County, Illinois
- Peoria Township (disambiguation)
- Peoria International Airport, Illinois

=== Canada ===
- Peoria, Alberta

== Music ==
- Peoria, a 2008 album by Future Clouds and Radar
- "Peoria", a song by King Crimson from the 1972 album Earthbound

== Other ==
- Peoria (moth), a genus of moths
- USS Peoria, the name of several ships

== See also ==
- Peoria High School (disambiguation)
- List of places named Peoria
- Will it play in Peoria?, an American English figure of speech
