= List of heated tobacco products =

There are various types of heated tobacco products in the marketplace. Some examples include products that use tobacco sticks such as glo and IQOS, or products that use loose-leaf tobacco such as PAX and Ploom. Some use product-specific customized cigarettes. There are devices that use cannabis. Heated tobacco products usually heat up tobacco, rather than use liquids. In contrast, electronic cigarettes heat liquids that can contain nicotine. They are not e-cigarettes. They can overlap with e-cigarettes such as a combination of an e-cigarette and a heated tobacco product, for the use of tobacco or e-liquid.

== Background ==
A wide variety of new tobacco- and smoking-related products have emerged on the market in recent years, as of 2018. Moreover, tobacco companies will keep developing new products to keep meeting the changing needs of their consumers and fulfill changing regulatory requirements. These tobacco-related products can quickly gain popularity, even before there is sufficient scientific evidence to determine their effects on the user and bystander. For instance, recently products marketed as "harm reduction," "reduced risk," or "next generation" products were introduced making claims of being up to 90% less harmful than traditional cigarettes, as of 2018. Even though these products seem very attractive to consumers, independent scientific research to support these claims is lacking. In addition, these products may be attractive for smokers, but may also be used by non-smokers. Besides, regardless of their own harmfulness, popular new products could also serve as a gateway to the use of tobacco or tobacco-related products.

According to a 2018 report, given their potential harmful health effects, and the possibility that these products serve as a gateway to the use of more harmful products, it is important for national authorities and scientists to closely monitor product development of new tobacco and tobacco-related products. Data on product development, marketing strategies, and consumer interest in new products could help to understand potential implications for public health and guide tobacco control efforts. The World Health Organization recognizes the importance of monitoring the availability and regulation of new tobacco and tobacco-related products entering national and global markets.

== Introduction ==
The tobacco control community is still deciding how to address the unexpected rise in popularity of e-cigarettes. However, there is another product innovation already emerging: Heated tobacco products. These products are being introduced in markets around the world by tobacco companies seeking to appeal to consumers who still demand the "throat-hit" delivered by traditional cigarettes but not by e-cigarettes.

Japan has been the focal market to test the potential of heated tobacco products as a cigarette alternative, where manufacturers have marketed several heated tobacco brands nationwide, including Japan Tobacco's "Ploom TECH" device in March 2016, Philip Morris International"s "iQOS" device in April 2016, and British American Tobacco's "glo" device in December 2016. As of 2017, tobacco industry leaders have predicted that heated tobacco products are poised to further displace traditional cigarette smoking and, by extension, tobacco control strategies typically framed around traditional cigarettes.

== Difference between regular cigarettes, heated tobacco products, and electronic cigarettes ==
A regular cigarette consists primarily of tobacco leaves wrapped in cigarette paper. It may also contain a filter, chemical additives, or other components. The user lights the tip of the cigarette to burn the tobacco and inhales the smoke through the unlit end.

A heated tobacco product consists of a heating source and tobacco. The tobacco may be wrapped in paper, which makes it a type of cigarette. However, the tobacco is heated to a lower temperature than a combusted cigarette to create an aerosol that the user inhales.

An electronic cigarette uses an e-liquid that may contain nicotine (typically derived from the tobacco plant), glycerin, propylene glycol, flavorings, and other ingredients. The device has an electric heat source that heats the e-liquid to create an aerosol that the user inhales.

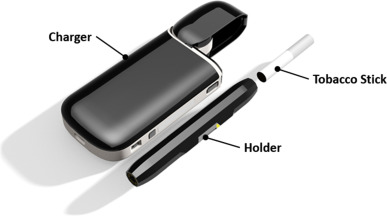
Three components of a heated tobacco product.

== Functionality ==
There are two types of heated tobacco products currently allowed to be sold in the US, as of 2019. One product type, which has been on the US market at various times since the 1990s, uses a carbon tip wrapped in glass fibers. The user lights the carbon tip, which heats the dried tobacco inside to a temperature that does not cause the product to create ash or burn down in size.

Another heated tobacco product called IQOS that recently obtained US Food and Drug Administration (US FDA) authorization in April 2019 consists of an electronic heating device and sticks made from dried tobacco wrapped in paper. The user places the stick into the electronic heating device, which pierces the stick with a glass-covered ceramic blade that heats the tobacco, creating an aerosol.

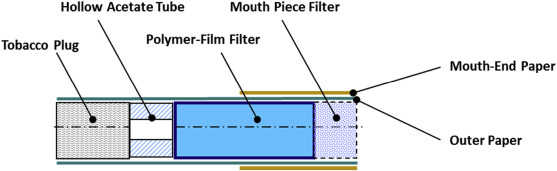
Cross-sectional view of a tobacco stick.

== Various types of heated tobacco products ==
There are a variety of products colloquially called heated tobacco products and heated tobacco products that do not appear to fit easily into universally agreed upon product categories. Products currently sold in global markets may function in various ways. For example, these products heat to various temperatures, can contain dry, moist, or liquid tobacco ingredients, and appear in a wide variety of shapes.

For the US FDA's purposes, if a tobacco product meets the legal definition of a cigarette but the tobacco is not heated to a temperature high enough to cause combustion, the product would be currently categorized as a non-combusted cigarette and regulated as a cigarette. As of 2019, the types of heated tobacco products currently authorized for sale in the US are all non-combusted cigarettes.

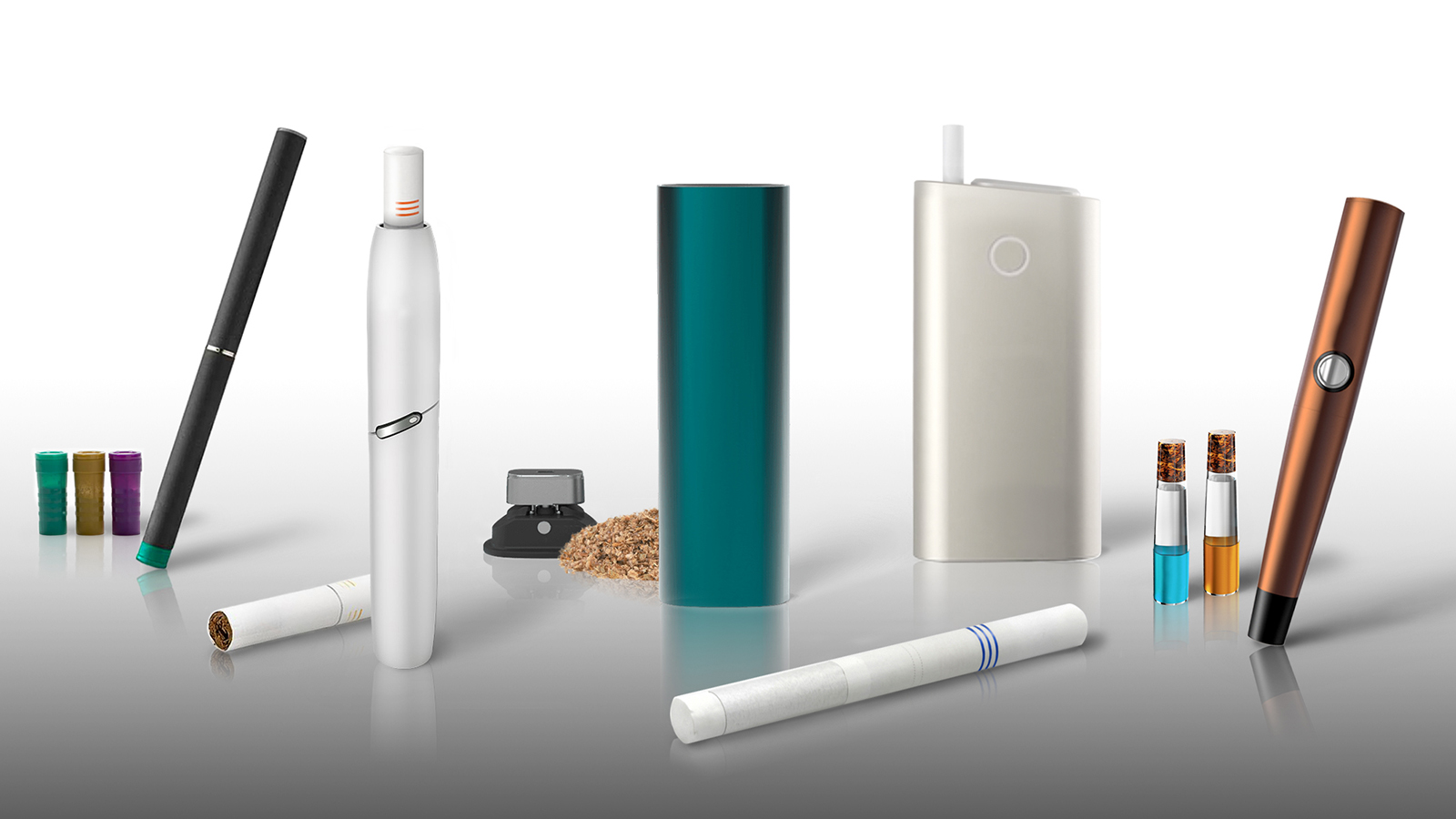
Various types of heated tobacco products.

== Heated tobacco predecessors ==
- Eclipse
- Premier

== List ==
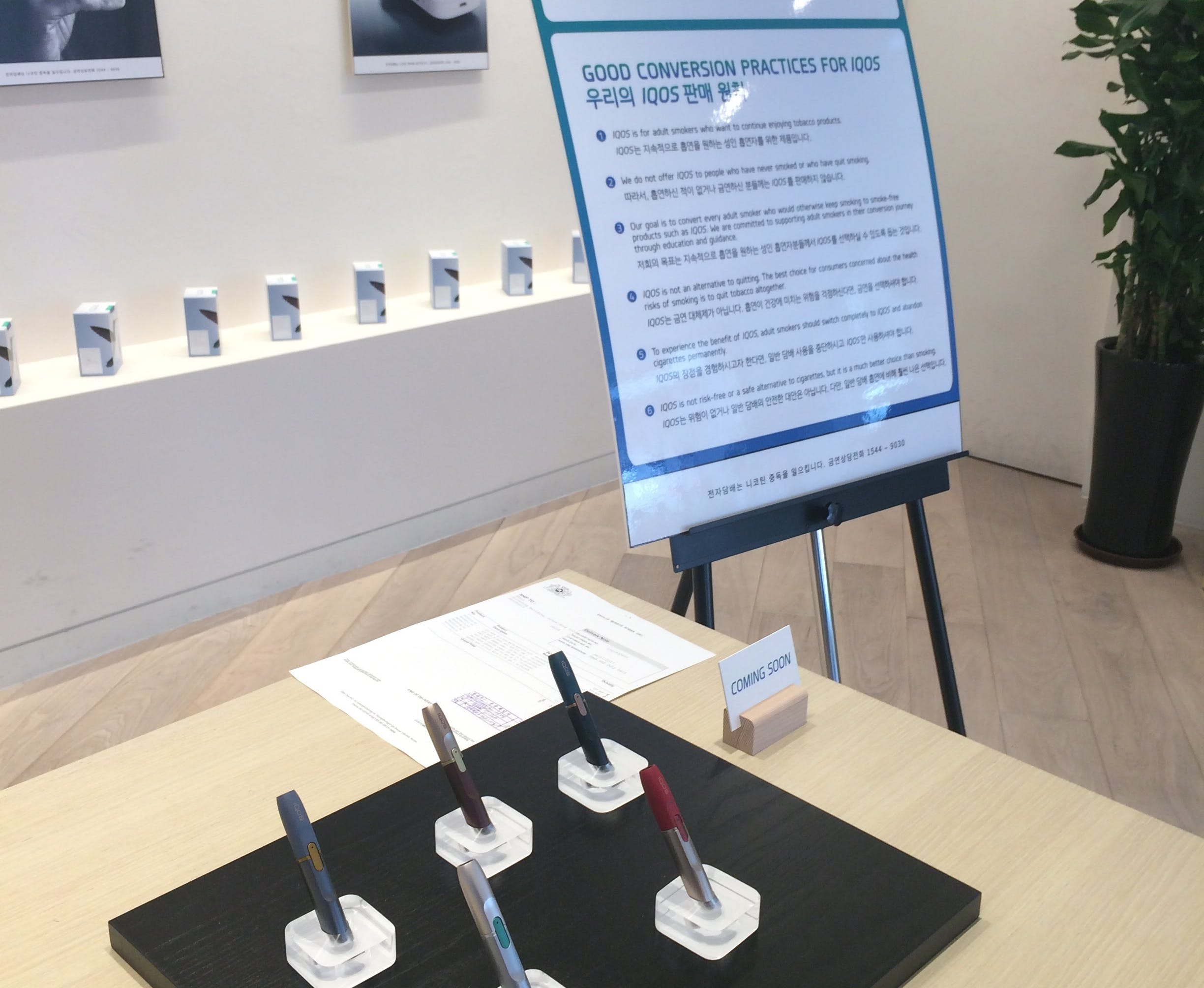
Interior view of IQOS store.

A US Food and Drug Administration official, Priscilla Callahan-Lyon, discussing heated tobacco products.

- IQOS
- PAX

== See also ==
- Composition of heated tobacco product emissions
- List of cigarette brands

== Bibliography ==
- McNeill, A; Brose, LS; Calder, R; Bauld, L; Robson, D (February 2018). "Evidence review of e-cigarettes and heated tobacco products 2018" (PDF). UK: Public Health England. pp. 1–243.
- "Regulatory Impact Statement: Regulation of smokeless tobacco and nicotine-delivery products" (PDF). Ministry of Health (New Zealand). 2017. pp. 1–52. Archived from the original (PDF) on 2019-06-17.
