= List of places named Peoria =

This is a list of places named Peoria, which includes geographic name features such as populated places, geographical features, and post offices — including combined forms of the name, such as West Peoria, Illinois, and variations of the name, such as Paola, Kansas.

The original Peoria is found in Illinois. The largest Peoria (since 2010) is found in Arizona. Several places named Peoria are now just ghost towns found on old maps.

== Peoria as a place name ==
The original Peoria (there are Native Americans still living who claim Peoria blood) were one of the principal tribes of the once-strong Illinois Confederation and had a language of the Algonquian family. The Algonquian nation had its ancient home north of the Great Lakes, whence the Peoria probably split off and drifted down the Mississippi Valley. Most places named Peoria derive — or probably derive — from the Peoria tribe of Native Americans. A few may owe their existence to settlers from Peoria, Illinois. Alternate spellings, as recorded by early European explorers in the lands of the Peoria, include Peoüarea, Pe8erea, Pianrea, Prouaria, and Peola.

=== Canada ===
Alberta

Populated places and locales

- Peoria — named for Peoria, Illinois — P.O. (?)

=== United States of America ===
Arizona

Populated places and locales

- Peoria (Maricopa County) — named for Peoria, Illinois, by settlers from there — P.O. 4 August 1888 to date

Streets

- Peoria Avenue — Phoenix metropolitan area

Education districts and facilities

- Peoria Unified School District
- Peoria High School
- Peoria Elementary School

Arkansas

Populated places and locales

- Peoria (Sebastian County) — P.O. 30 April 1878 to 31 December 1915 (mail to Mansfield)

California

Geographical features

- Peoria Basin (Tuolumne County) — geographical feature
- Peoria Creek (Tuolumne County) — geographical feature
- Peoria Mountain (Tuolumne County) — geographical feature
- Peoria Pass (Tuolumne County) — geographical feature

Other classes of features

- Peoria Bar (Plumas County) — gold-mine camp
- Peoria Bar (Tuolumne County) — gold-mine camp
- Peoria Flat (Tuolumne County) — gold-mine camp
- Peoria House (Yuba County) — stage stop
- Peoria House (Yuba County) — school district
- Peoria House (Yuba County) — cemetery

Colorado

Populated places and locales

- Peoria (Arapahoe County) — P.O. 5 March 1906 to 15 January 1914 (mail to Byers)

Streets

- Peoria Street (?) — Denver

Florida

Populated places and locales

- Peoria (Clay County) — P.O. 18 September 1886 to 30 January 1932 (mail to Doctors Inlet)

Geographical features

- Peoria Point (Clay County) — cape

Illinois

Populated places and locales

- East Peoria (Tazewell County) — [1] P.O. "Little Detroit" 20 September 1833 to 1 September 1836; Reestablished 15 May 1848 to 23 October 1863 (to East Peoria); P.O. "East Peoria" 23 October 1863 to 3 June 1867 (to Little Detroit); P.O. "Little Detroit" 3 June 1867 to 4 April 1871. [2] P.O. "East Peoria" 25 January 1886 to 11 November 1886 (mail to Peoria). [3] P.O. "Hilton" 11 April 1870 to 2 November 1889 (to East Peoria); P.O. "East Peoria" 2 November 1889 to 26 October 1900 (mail to Peoria).
- Lower Peoria (Peoria County)
- North Peoria (Peoria County) — P.O. 26 April 1886 to 4 August 1898 (mail to Peoria)
- Peoria (Peoria County) — settled 1730 — P.O. 8 March 1823 to date
- Peoriaville (Peoria County) — P.O. for Newburgh (not contiguous with Peoria) — P.O. 27 February 1850 to 12 February 1855
- Peoria District Junction (Logan County) — junction of PL&D RR and St. Louis RR — RFD Lincoln
- Peoria Gardens (Peoria County)
- Peoria Heights (Peoria County)
- Peoria Junction (McLean County) — now named Chenoa
- Peoria Junction (Peoria County) — CRI&P RR — RFD Peoria
- Peoria Mills (Peoria County)
- South Peoria (Peoria County)
- South East Peoria (Tazewell County) — addition to East Peoria
- West Peoria (Peoria County)

Civil features

- Peoria County
- Peoria Township (Peoria County)

Geographical features

- Peoria Lake — section of Illinois River

Streets

- Peoria Street — Springfield
- Peoria Street — Chicago
- Peoria Avenue — Peoria
- Peoria Street — Lincoln
- Peoria Street — Washington
- Peoria Street — Pekin
- Peoria Street — Hanna City

Indiana

Populated places and locales

- Peoria (Franklin County) — same as Peoria (Butler County) Ohio — named for Peoria Indians — reportedly had alternate name of "Ingleside" — P.O. 5 May 1837 to 15 January 1858; Reestablished 17 April 1872 to 8 February 1876; Reestablished 11 April 1876 to 15 February 1889 (mail to Reily, Ohio); Reestablished 7 February 1891 to 2 January 1907 (mail to Oxford, Ohio)
- Peoria (Miami County) — named for Peoria, Illinois, by settlers from the East who had intended to settle in Peoria, but stopped — P.O. "Reserve"
- Peoria Junction (Cass County)

Iowa

Populated places and locales

- Peoria (Mahaska County) — P.O. "Warrensville" 16 August 1849 to 15 November 1854 (to Peoria); P.O. "Peoria" 15 November 1854 to 15 January 1906 (mail to Pella)
- Peoria (Wayne County) — P.O. "Samville" 28 July 1886 to 11 March 1887 (to Bentonville); P.O. "Bentonville" 11 March 1887 to 2 July 1895 — town renamed "Bentonville"; now defunct
- Peoria City (Polk and Story counties) — "Peoria" on some maps — platted in Polk County — P.O. 8 May 1856 to 5 April 1883 (Polk County)

Populated places and locales — variant spellings

- Peiro (Woodbury County) — reportedly a linguistic variation of "Peoria" — P.O. 6 November 1877 to 30 June 1904

Kansas

Populated places and locales

- Peoria (Franklin County) — P.O "Pioria" 15 June 1857 to 26 July 1860; "Peoria" 27 July 1860 to 30 April 1934 (mail to Ottawa)
- Peoria Village — now Paola (Miami County) — named for Peoria Indians (but see Paola, below) — P.O. ?
- "Peoria" — proposed name for Osawatomie (Miami County)

Populated places and locales — variant spellings

- Paola (Miami County) — formerly Peoria Village — named for Baptiste Peoria, a leader of the Peoria Indians — linguistic variation of "Peoria" — P.O. "Paola" (late Peoria Village) 13 February 1856 to date

Civil features

- Peoria Township (Franklin County)
- Paola Township (Miami County)

Kentucky

Populated places and locales — variant spellings

- Peolia (Washington County) — relationship to "Peoria" not determined

Minnesota

- Peoria (Todd County) — P.O. 1883 to 1886

Mississippi

Populated places and locales

- Peoria (Amite County) — original P.O. "Robinson" — P.O. "Peoria" 15 July 1904 to 22 June 1962 (mail to Liberty)

Missouri

Populated places and locales

- Peoria (Bates County) — probably named for Peoria Indians — P.O. 22 June 1859 to 15 April 1863; Reestablished 31 July 1867 to 29 June 1869
- Peoria (Washington County) — named for Peoria, Illinois, from list of names suggested by Post Office Department — probably existed as P.O. only — P.O. 24 April 1908 to 19 September 1934 (mail to Bismarck)

Geographical features

- Peola Branch (Reynolds County) — stream — linguistic variation of "Peoria"

Nebraska

Populated places and locales

- Peoria (Knox County) — P.O. 9 Nov 1883 to 3 Aug 1893 (mail to Bloomfield)

Civil features

- Peoria Township (Knox County)

Populated places and locales — variant spellings

- Peora (Richardson County) — relationship to "Peoria" not determined

New Mexico

Other classes of features

- Peoria Tank — reservoir

New York

Populated places and locales

- Peoria (Albany County) — different name before "Peoria" — name changed to "West Berne" — no P.O. as "Peoria"
- Peoria (Wyoming County) — P.O. 3 February 1842 to 15 August 1911 (mail to Pavilion)

North Carolina

Populated places and locales

- Peoria (Watauga County) — P.O. 9 January 1903 to 31 May 1938 (mail to Reese)

Streets

- Peoria Road (Watauga County)

Ohio

Populated places and locales

- Peoria (Butler County) — same as Peoria (Franklin County) Indiana — no P.O. in Ohio
- Peoria (Union County) — P.O. 26 September 1872 to 11 August 1967 (mail to Columbus)

Streets

- Peoria-Reily Road (Butler County)
- Peoria Loop Road (Union County)

Oklahoma

Populated places and locales

- Peoria (Beaver County) — named for Peoria, Illinois — P.O. 1 March 1890 to 29 April 1891
- Peoria (Ottawa County) — located on Peoria Reservation — originally a mining camp — P.O. 18 January 1897 to 29 November 1941 (mail to Baxter Springs, Kansas)

Civil features

- Peoria Township (Ottawa County)

Streets

- Peoria Street — Miami
- Peoria Street — Tulsa

Oregon

Populated places and locales

- Peoria (Linn County) — probably named for "Peoria Party" of settlers which left Peoria, Illinois, in May 1839 — P.O. "Burlington" 17 November 1853 to 7 November 1857 (to Peoria); P.O. "Peoria" 7 November 1857 to 10 August 1900 (mail to Shedds; name changed to "Shedd" 13 November 1915)

South Dakota

Populated places and locales

- Peoria Bottom (or Bottoms) (Hughes County) — named for steamboat named Peoria, which went aground there — no P.O.

Civil features

- Peoria Township (Hughes County)

Geographical features

- Peoria Bottom (or Bottoms) (Hughes County) — name changed to Peoria Flat - geographical feature
- Peoria Flat (Hughes County) — formerly Peoria Bottom (or Bottoms) — geographical feature

Texas

Populated places and locales

- Peoria (Hill County) — named for Peoria, Illinois, by a settler from there — P.O. 3 October 1856 to 5 November 1866; Reestablished 13 February 1867 to 15 December 1907 (mail to Hillsboro)

Washington

Populated places and locales

- Peola (Garfield County) — linguistic variation of "Peoria" — P.O. unknown

=== Other instances ===
- USS Peoria — ship

== See also ==
- Peoria (disambiguation)
- Will it play in Peoria?

== Sources ==
- Scheetz, George H. "Peoria". In Place Names in the Midwestern United States. Edited by Edward Callary. (Studies in Onomastices; 1.) Mellen Press, 2000. ISBN 0-7734-7723-3
- U.S. Board on Geographic Names
