= Solanesol =

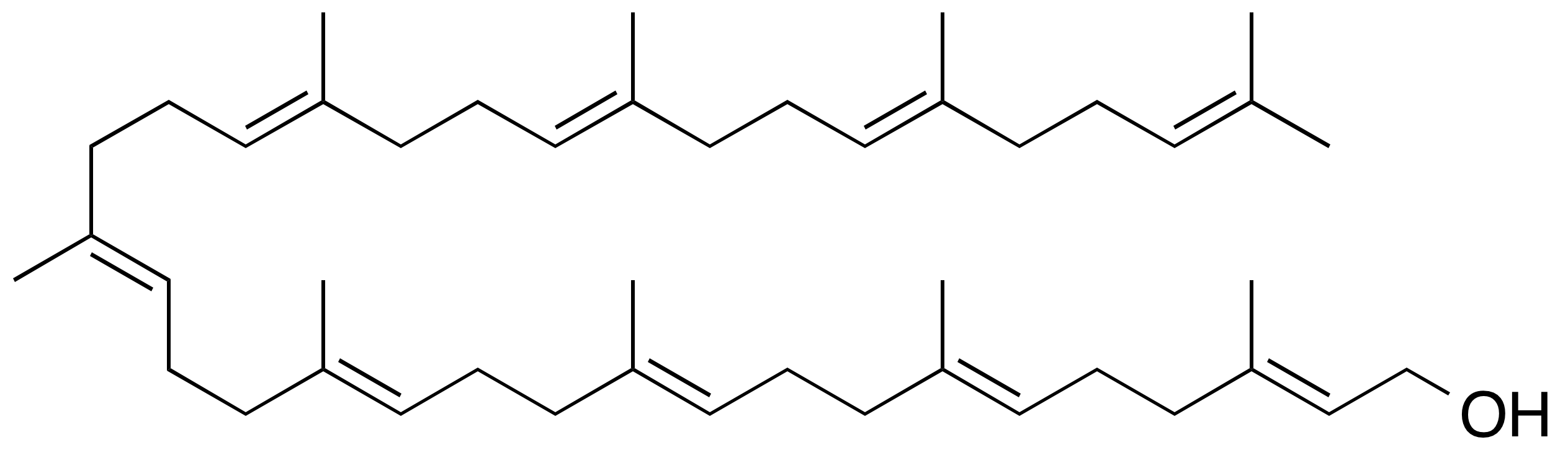

Names
- Preferred IUPAC name (2E,6E,10E,14E,18E,22E,26E,30E)-3,7,11,15,19,23,27,31,35-Nonamethylhexatriaconta-2,6,10,14,18,22,26,30,34-nonaen-1-ol

Identifiers
CAS Number	13190-97-1
3D model (JSmol)	Interactive image
ChEBI	CHEBI:26718
ChEMBL	ChEMBL1567436
ChemSpider	4585196
ECHA InfoCard	100.116.588
EC Number	603-532-7
PubChem CID	5477212
UNII	FF31XTR2N4
CompTox Dashboard (EPA)	DTXSID60884580
- InChI: InChI=1S/C45H74O/c1-37(2)19-11-20-38(3)21-12-22-39(4)23-13-24-40(5)25-14-26-41(6)27-15-28-42(7)29-16-30-43(8)31-17-32-44(9)33-18-34-45(10)35-36-46/h19,21,23,25,27,29,31,33,35,46H,11-18,20,22,24,26,28,30,32,34,36H2,1-10H3/b38-21+,39-23+,40-25+,41-27+,42-29+,43-31+,44-33+,45-35+ Key: AFPLNGZPBSKHHQ-MEGGAXOGSA-N
- SMILES: CC(=CCC/C(=C/CC/C(=C/CC/C(=C/CC/C(=C/CC/C(=C/CC/C(=C/CC/C(=C/CC/C(=C/CO)/C)/C)/C)/C)/C)/C)/C)/C)C

Properties
Chemical formula	C_{45}H_{74}O
Molar mass	631.086 g·mol^{−1}
Appearance	white or colorless wax
Melting point	33–35 °C (91–95 °F; 306–308 K)
- Except where otherwise noted, data are given for materials in their standard state (at 25 °C [77 °F], 100 kPa). Infobox references

Solanesol is the organic compound with the formula Me_{2}C=CHCH_{2}(CH_{2}C(Me)=CHCH_{2})_{8}OH. It is an all trans stereoisomer. This white, waxy solid is classified as an nonaisoprenoid. Solanesol is a non-cyclic terpene alcohol that consists of nine isoprene units and mainly accumulates in solanaceous plants such as tobacco, potato, and tomato. It is extractable from the stems and leaves of solanaceous species. It is notable as the biosynthetic precursor to coenzyme Q_{10}.

== Occurrence ==
Solanesol is a non-cyclic terpene alcohol that consists of nine isoprene units and mainly accumulates in solanaceous plants such as tobacco, potato, and tomato. It is also accumulates in eggplant and pepper plants. It is notable as the biosynthetic precursor to coenzyme Q_{10}. The leaf tobacco contains the tobacco-specific compound solanesol. It is found in tobacco smoke and in the emissions of heat-not-burn tobacco products. Tobacco has the highest solanesol content amongst all solanaceous plants. It is extractable from tobacco waste.

== Functions ==
Solanesol is a secondary metabolite. Various plants produce numerous highly-specific terpenoids that play important roles in plant–environment interactions. In tobacco, solanesol might participate in the immune response towards pathogens: in a 2017 study by Bajda et al., the solanesol content in resistant tobacco varieties increased by more than 7 times one week after infection by the tobacco mosaic virus (TMV), while it did not increase significantly after infection in susceptible varieties. In potato, as compared to normal temperatures (22 °C during the day, 16 °C at night), moderately high temperatures (30 °C during the day, 20 °C at night) caused a more than six-fold increase in the solanesol content after one week, indicating that solanesol might play an important role in the response of potato to moderately high temperatures. Hence, solanesol plays important roles in the interactions of solanaceous plants with environmental factors.

== Activities ==
Solanesol possesses antimicrobial, anti-tumor, anti-inflammatory, and anti-ulcer activities, and it serves as an important pharmaceutical intermediate for the synthesis of coenzyme Q_{10}, vitamin K_{2}, and N-solanesyl-N,N′-bis(3,4-dimethoxybenzyl) ethylenediamine (SDB). The physiological functions of coenzyme Q_{10} include anti-oxidation, anti-aging, immune-function enhancement, cardiovascular enhancement, brain-function enhancement, and the regulation of blood lipids; it may be used for treating migraines, neurodegenerative diseases, hypertension, and cardiovascular diseases, and as a dietary supplement for patients with type 2 diabetes. Vitamin K_{2} promotes bone growth, inhibits bone resorption, stimulates bone mineralization, has preventive and therapeutic effects on osteoporosis, diminishes blood clotting, and reduces the progression of arteriosclerosis. The anti-cancer agent synergizer SDB allows P-glycoprotein-mediated multidrug resistance in cancer cells to be overcome, and has synergistic effects with certain anti-tumor drugs. Recently as of 2017, it was found that solanesol induces the expression of HO-1 and Hsp70, which in turn alleviates alcohol-induced liver cell damage. Additionally, it inhibits the generation of inflammatory cytokines through the p38 and Akt signalling pathways, implying an anti-inflammatory effect. Therefore, solanesol and its derivatives are highly valuable from a pharmaceutical perspective.

== Overview ==
Solanesol is a non-cyclic terpene alcohol that consists of nine isoprene units. Solanesol serves an important role in the interactions between plants and their environment, and it is a key intermediate for the pharmaceutical synthesis of ubiquinone-based supplements and drugs. Notably, although solanesol and its derivatives are highly valuable from a pharmaceutical perspective, solanesol as a C45 compound may act as a tumorigenic precursor in tobacco smoke. While in recent years as of 2017, studies on the identification of key enzymatic genes in solanesol biosynthesis and gene function have achieved significant progress, a number of questions on the regulatory mechanisms of solanesol synthesis remain unanswered. Genome sequencing of solanaceous plants such as tobacco, potato, and tomato has paved the way for deeper studies on the metabolic regulation of solanesol biosynthesis.

Transcriptomics and metabolomics studies may aid in resolving the metabolic flux distribution of solanesol and the mechanisms through which it interacts with other metabolic pathways. The creation of NtSPS1-overexpressing tobacco plants has been accomplished in a laboratory setting, which makes it possible to evaluate the effects of SPS1 overexpression on solanesol and related metabolites, photosynthesis, and the expression levels of key solanesol biosynthetic and related genes in tobacco. Moreover, overexpression of key enzymatic genes will allow tobacco plants with high solanesol content to be obtained, with significant importance for medical applications. Microbial heterologous expression of key tobacco enzymatic genes may be used to identify their function and to generate solanesol derivatives of medicinal value.
