= Will it play in Peoria? =

Phrase metaphorically asking if something has mainstream appeal

Will it play in Peoria? is an American English figure of speech that is traditionally used to ask whether a given product, person, promotional theme, or event will appeal to mainstream audiences or across a broad range of demographic and psychographic groups in the United States.

The phrase is believed to have originated from the popularity of Peoria, Illinois, as a stop on the vaudeville circuit, where acts would gauge new material by how well it was received by Peoria audiences, using Peoria as a test market.

== Peoria as a metaphor ==
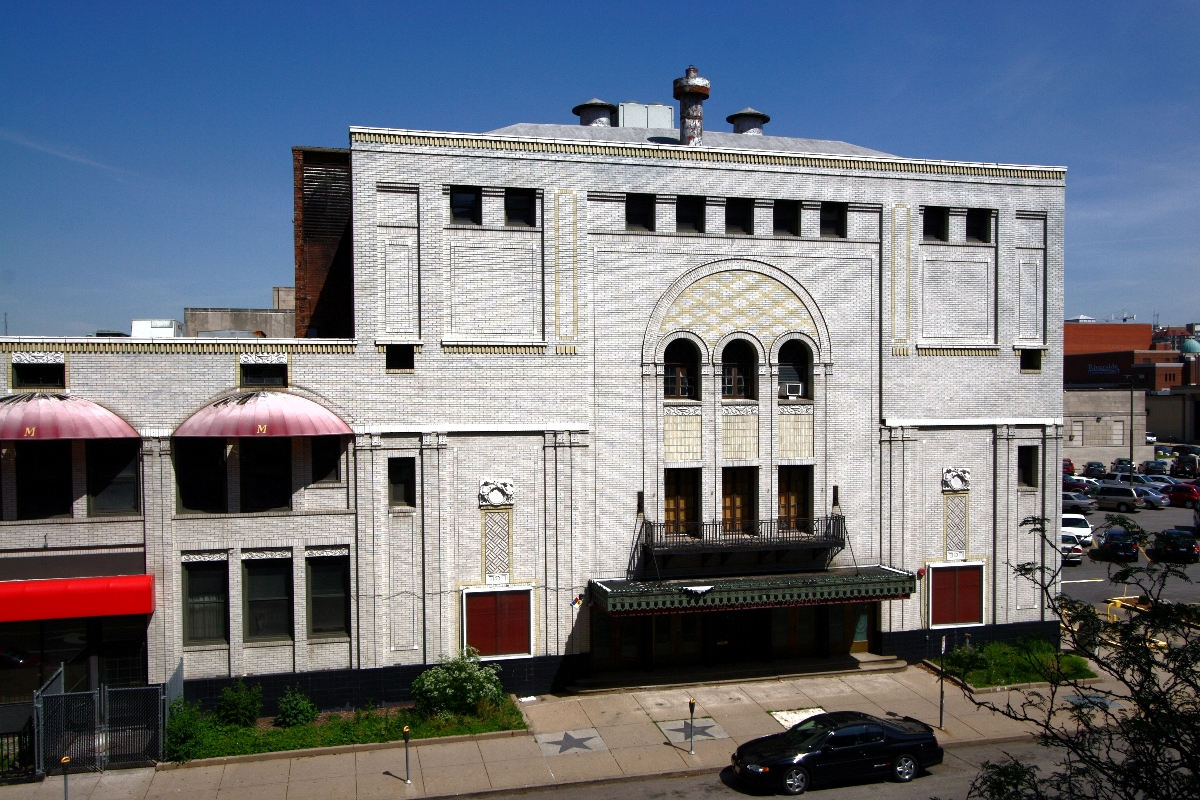
Peoria's Madison Theatre, which hosted both vaudeville and film in the early 20th century

Peoria, Illinois has developed an unusual reputation over the decades, such that a kind of folklore has grown around the name. The famous catchphrase about "playing in Peoria" has origins in vaudeville or burlesque. Don Marine, professor at Illinois Central College (East Peoria), commented:

If one were to choose the city in the United States most victimized in jokes and anecdotes by theatrical personalities, the selection of Peoria, Illinois, would be a popular, if not likely choice. Two of the more popular quips are: "Say, I hear you got married. How did that ever happen?" "I was playing a split-bill in Peoria—and it rained!" and "Have you ever played Peoria?" "Peoria? Oh, yes—I spent four years there one night!" The widespread appeal of this verbal maligning by comics, actors and other performers suggests Peoria as a paramount example of the dull, banal, and provincial theatrical road stop. But the popularity of the "put down" suggests as well that the city possesses a theatrical heritage of considerable longevity.

Marine judged Peoria the way Peorians in the late 20th century usually seemed to judge themselves—that is, dull, banal, and provincial. Historically, however, whiskey, gambling, and prostitution gave the city a reputation as being "wide open". Only since the 1950s was the lid put on Peoria; but the reputation, and thus the gibes, has existed since vaudeville.

A 1945 comment in American Notes and Queries offers a different point of view:

Peoria (Ill.) has been an old stand-by with comedians for years—but not only because of the "O" sound. Nor because of the four vowel sounds that give it a nice noisy resonance. But largely, I suspect, because of the fact that it is a whiskey town and a river town and not particularly famous for what is known as the genteel tradition.

The phrase may have originated during the vaudeville era. The belief was that if a new show was successful in Peoria, a main Midwestern stop for vaudeville acts, it would be successful anywhere.

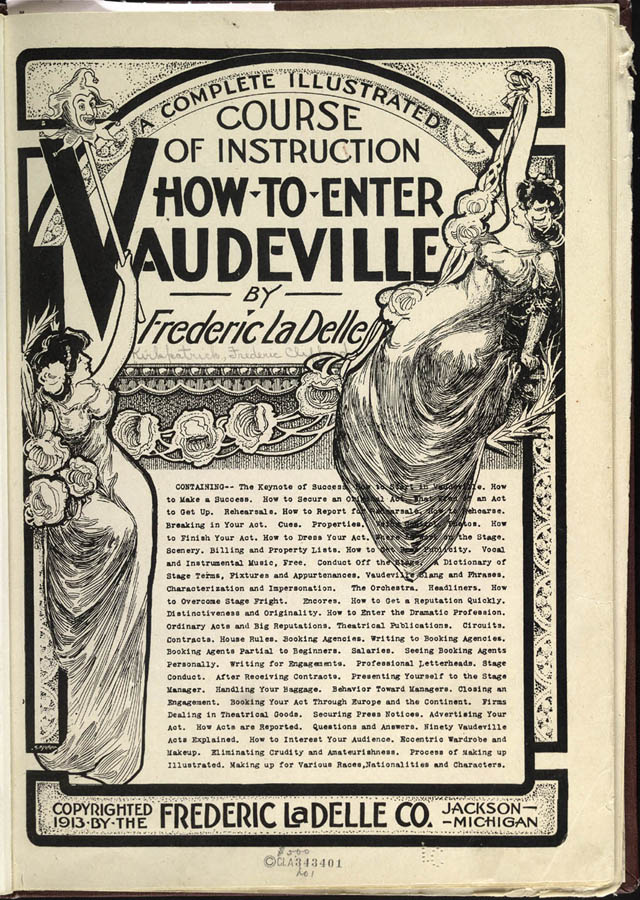
Old booklet: How to Enter Vaudeville

Jack Mabley, writing in the Chicago Tribune, concluded that "if it plays in Peoria it has good taste," but a more apt meaning is, according to James C. Ballowe, former dean of Peoria's Bradley University graduate school, that "Peoria is a tough audience." In other words, "it bombed in Peoria" or "it was great in Peoria" had recognizable meaning from one coast to the other.

The phrase subsequently was adopted by politicians, pollsters, and promoters to question the potential mainstream acceptance of anything new. Currently, the stereotype of non-humorous people has been around for many decades.

Although vaudeville left Peoria many years ago, the phrase was revived in 1969 when John D. Ehrlichman said to a newsman, "Don't worry, it'll play in Peoria," in reference to a decision by President Richard M. Nixon that seemed calculated to upset Easterners. Peoria, Illinois, cashed in on the free publicity with a successful advertising campaign to lure new business to the city.

Director Terry George referred to Peoria when discussing with Don Cheadle how he crafted Hotel Rwanda to appeal to mainstream U.S. audiences, and he stated that he also wished for The Promise to have the same appeal.

== Peoria as test market ==
In the United States, Peoria has long been seen as a prototypical American city because of its representative demographics and its Midwestern culture, which is commonly perceived as mainstream. As a result, it has traditionally been one of the country's leading test markets. In the 1980s and 1990s, comedians like Sam Kinison and musicians such as Bob Dylan, Robert Plant, Metallica and Phil Collins all perfected and launched concert tours in Peoria. During presidential campaigns, major TV networks would visit Peoria to gauge the response of everyday Americans on national issues and political candidates.

However, by 1992, demographic changes had made the city less representative of America as a whole, and therefore less attractive as a test market.

== See also ==
- Bellwether
- General American
- Haßloch – Germany's test market city
- List of places named Peoria
- Peoria (disambiguation)
- Peoria in popular culture
- Price of milk question
- Pomona in popular culture
