= USS Peoria =

USS Peoria has been the name of four ships in the United States Navy. They have all been named after Peoria, Illinois.

- USS Peoria (1863) was a sidewheel steamer that served in 1867.
- USS Peoria (1898) a converted steel gunboat 1898–1921
- USS Peoria (PF-67), a Tacoma-class frigate
- USS Peoria (LST-1183), a Newport-class tank landing ship, commissioned 21 February 1970 and decommissioned on 28 January 1994
