= Peola Branch =

Stream in the American state of Missouri

Coordinates: 37°25′02″N 90°49′47″W

Peola Branch is a stream in Reynolds County in the U.S. state of Missouri. It is a tributary of the Black River. The confluence with the Black is approximately 2.5 miles south of Lesterville.

Peola Branch most likely is a corruption of "Peoria".

== See also ==
- List of rivers of Missouri
