= Peoria High School =

Peoria High School is the name of multiple secondary schools in the United States:

- Peoria High School (Arizona), in Peoria, Arizona
- Peoria High School (Peoria, Illinois), in Peoria, Illinois — also known as Central

== See also ==
- East Peoria Community High School, in East Peoria, Illinois
- Peoria Accelerated High School, in Peoria, Arizona
- Peoria Heights High School, in Peoria Heights, Illinois
- Peoria Notre Dame High School, in Peoria, Illinois
