= Premier (cigarette) =

Type of smokeless cigarette

- A man holds a pack of Premier cigarettes.
- Product type: Cigarette
- Produced by: R.J. Reynolds Tobacco Company
- Country: United States
- Introduced: 1988; 38 years ago
- Discontinued: 1989
- Previous owners: Lorillard Tobacco Company

Premier was an American brand of smokeless cigarettes which was owned and manufactured by the R.J. Reynolds Tobacco Company (RJR). Premier was released in the United States in 1988. It was the first commercial heated tobacco product. However, it was difficult to use and tasted unpleasant; as a result, it was unpopular with consumers. A commercial failure, the brand was a significant financial loss for RJR and was quickly taken off the market.

== Design and development ==
The cigarettes looked like conventional cigarettes, but featured a hard casing and contained only a small amount of processed tobacco along with flavor beads. Lighting a carbon tip on the end of the cigarette would heat the tobacco and the flavor beads, allowing the inhalation of a nicotine aerosol with minimal smoke and no tar. Developed as a reaction to a growing anti-smoking sentiment, Premier cigarettes were designed to reduce or eliminate unhealthy side effects associated with smoking, both to the smoker and to the people around the smoker. RJR hoped that smokers concerned about these health effects would switch to Premier instead of quitting smoking.

Unfortunately for RJR, smokers across multiple test markets disliked the product for multiple reasons, primarily concerning flavor and ease of use. It was unpopular with users when it was test-marketed in Arizona and Missouri. Research conducted in the United States found that less than 5% of smokers enjoyed the taste. Research in Japan was even less promising: reportedly, researchers were explicitly told, "This tastes like shit." Lighting the cigarettes with sulfur matches caused a reaction between the sulfur and the carbon tip that resulted in an odor that RJR's own chief executive officer F. Ross Johnson described as "like a fart." Finally, they were frustratingly difficult for smokers to draw on.

While RJR itself questioned whether the device functioned adequately as a nicotine delivery device, activists derided it for its potential for use in delivery of street drugs such as crack cocaine. The American Medical Association and other organizations recommended that the US Food and Drug Administration (FDA) should restrict it or classify it as a drug.

In 1989, after spending an estimated $300 to $325 million to develop and deploy Premier, R. J. Reynolds pulled the device from the market after only months. Total losses from the failure are estimated at $800 million to $1 billion.

R.J. Reynolds reintroduced the concept behind the Premier cigarette as the Eclipse brand in the 1990s.

== Tylee Wilson ==
Tylee Wilson was the CEO of RJR Nabisco, the then parent company of RJR. Controversy arose when J. Paul Sticht, then the chairman of the board of directors, noticed a new Reynolds building in Winston-Salem. His driver told him, "That's where they're going to work on that smokeless cigarette." Sticht learned that Wilson had been hiding this boondoggle from the board of directors for five years, since 1981. Wilson argued that the project would help take back the lead in the tobacco industry from Philip Morris, who had recently overtaken Reynolds. Due to the growing health controversies related to tobacco, Wilson hoped Premier would keep smokers from quitting and draw ex-smokers back to Reynolds. He argued that the project was kept under wraps because it was unclear when development of the product would be completed.

Wilson was brought before the board of directors, some of whom thought the cigarette tasted and smelled unpleasant, but their main concern was Wilson's lack of disclosure. Hundreds of employees, including the chairman's driver, had known about the project, an ad agency was being consulted, outside scientists and suppliers were in the loop. It seemed like Wilson only held disclosure from his board. When addressing his lack of transparency, board member Juanita M. Kreps said, "I, for one, absolutely resent that." At this point Wilson had authorized $68 million for the development of Premier, an amount he was not allowed to approve without consent from the audit committee.

F. Ross Johnson, the COO and President of RJR Nabisco, would be chosen as the new CEO. In an effort to quickly oust Wilson, a pact was made between him and the board of directors: Wilson would be given a lump-sum of $3.25 million, have continuation of his salary, and a bonus of $1.3 million until his official retirement at the end of 1987 with retirement pay of $600,000 thereafter.

== See also ==
- Tobacco smoking
