= Heated tobacco product =

Type of tobacco product

A heated tobacco product (HTP) (Note: Also variously known as a partially combustion heat-not-burn product, heat-not-burn device, heat-not-burn tobacco product (HNB), Heat-not-Burn tobacco product, heat-not-burn cigarette (HC), heat-not-burn cig, HNB tobacco product, HnB tobacco product, HNB product, HnB product, heat-not-burn tobacco device, heat-not-burn system, HnB system, heat-not-burn (HNB) device, heat-not-burn device, HNB device, HnB tobacco device, HnB device, HNB cigarette, heated cigarette, HTP cigarette, cigarette-like product, mini-cigarette, electronic heated tobacco product, electronically heated cigarette smoking system (EHCSS), electrically heated cigarette smoking system, electrically heated tobacco system, non-combusted cigarette, non-combusted tobacco product, tobacco heating cigarette, tobacco heating product, tobacco heating system (THS), smokeless cigarette, smokeless tobacco stick, tobacco stick product, loose-leaf tobacco vaporizer (LLTV), tobacco vaporizer, or T-vapor.) is a tobacco product that heats tobacco at a lower temperature than conventional cigarettes. The heat generates an aerosol or smoke for inhalation, containing nicotine, a highly addictive substance, and other chemicals. HTPs may also contain additives not naturally present in tobacco, including flavoring chemicals. HTPs generally heat tobacco to temperatures below 600 °C (1100 °F), which is lower than the combustion temperature of conventional cigarettes.

HTPs use embedded or external heat sources, heated sealed chambers, or product-specific customized cigarettes. Unlike e-cigarettes, which vaporize nicotine-containing liquids, HTPs typically use leaf tobacco or another solid form, though some hybrid models can use both solid tobacco and e-liquids. There are various types of HTPs. The two most common designs are battery-powered devices that heat tobacco leaf (e.g., IQOS, glo, Pax) and devices that heat tobacco using a carbon ember (e.g., Eclipse, REVO, TEEPS). Similar devices exist for heating cannabis.

A 2016 World Health Organization report found no evidence supporting claims of reduced risk or health benefits compared with conventional cigarettes. A 2018 Public Health England review concluded that HTPs may pose less risk than conventional cigarettes but more risk than e-cigarettes. Some HTP aerosols have been found to contain nicotine and carcinogen levels comparable to those of traditional cigarettes. Although HTPs may be less harmful than smoking, the UK Committee on Toxicity recommends complete cessation instead of switching to HTPs. There is insufficient evidence on the effectiveness of HTPs for smoking cessation, or on the risks of second-hand exposure. Limited evidence suggests that toxic emissions from HTPs are higher than those from e-cigarettes. Some smokers have reported HTPs to be less satisfying than traditional cigarettes.

Tobacco companies initially began developing alternative tobacco products in the 1960s. HTPs were first marketed in 1988 but were unsuccessful. The industry’s renewed interest in HTPs has been partly linked to global declines in tobacco consumption. The latest generation of HTPs has been promoted as a potential—though unproven—harm-reduction option. Existing smoking bans vary in whether they apply to HTPs.

== History ==
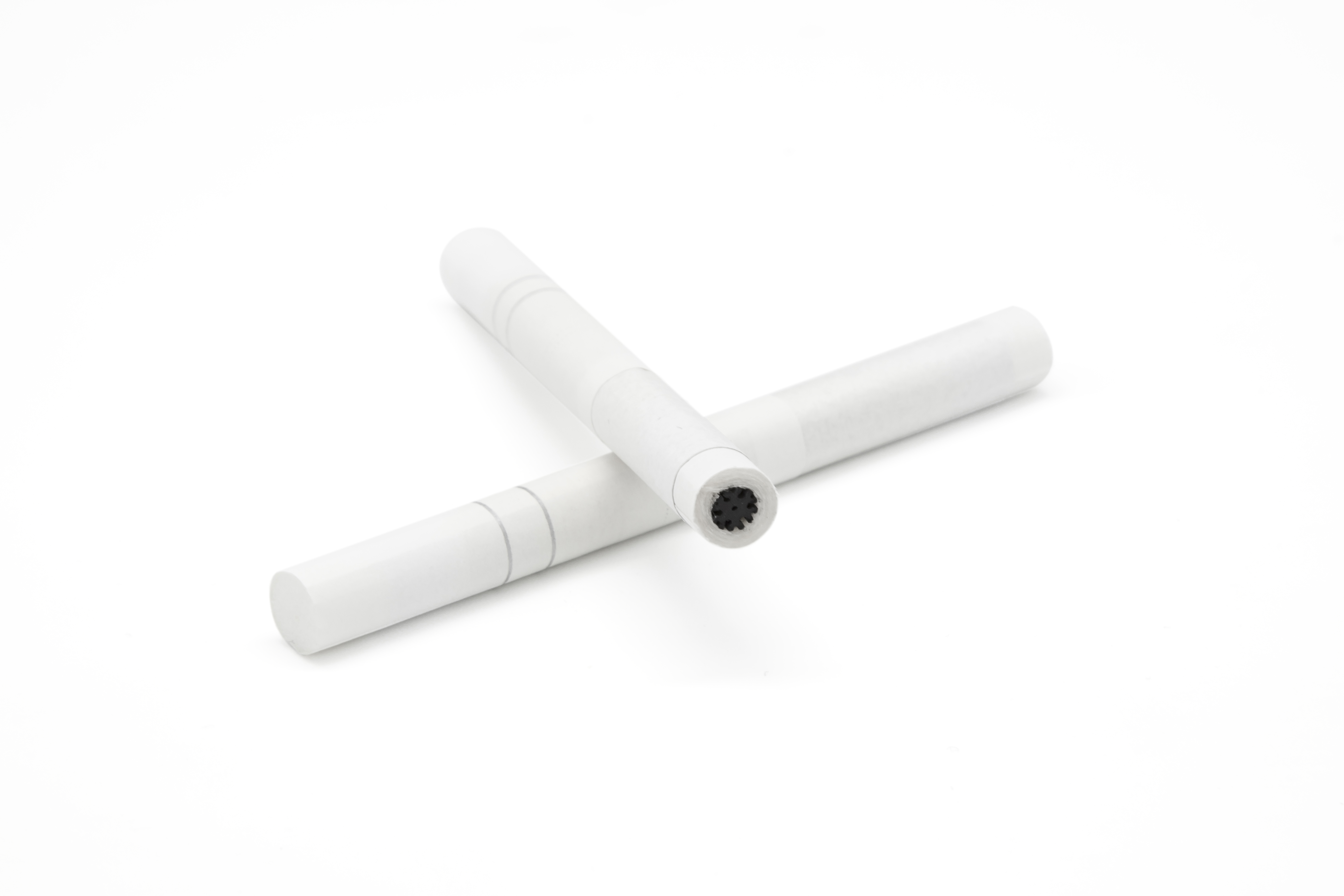
Steam Hot One, a Japanese variant of the Eclipse made by Japan Tobacco.

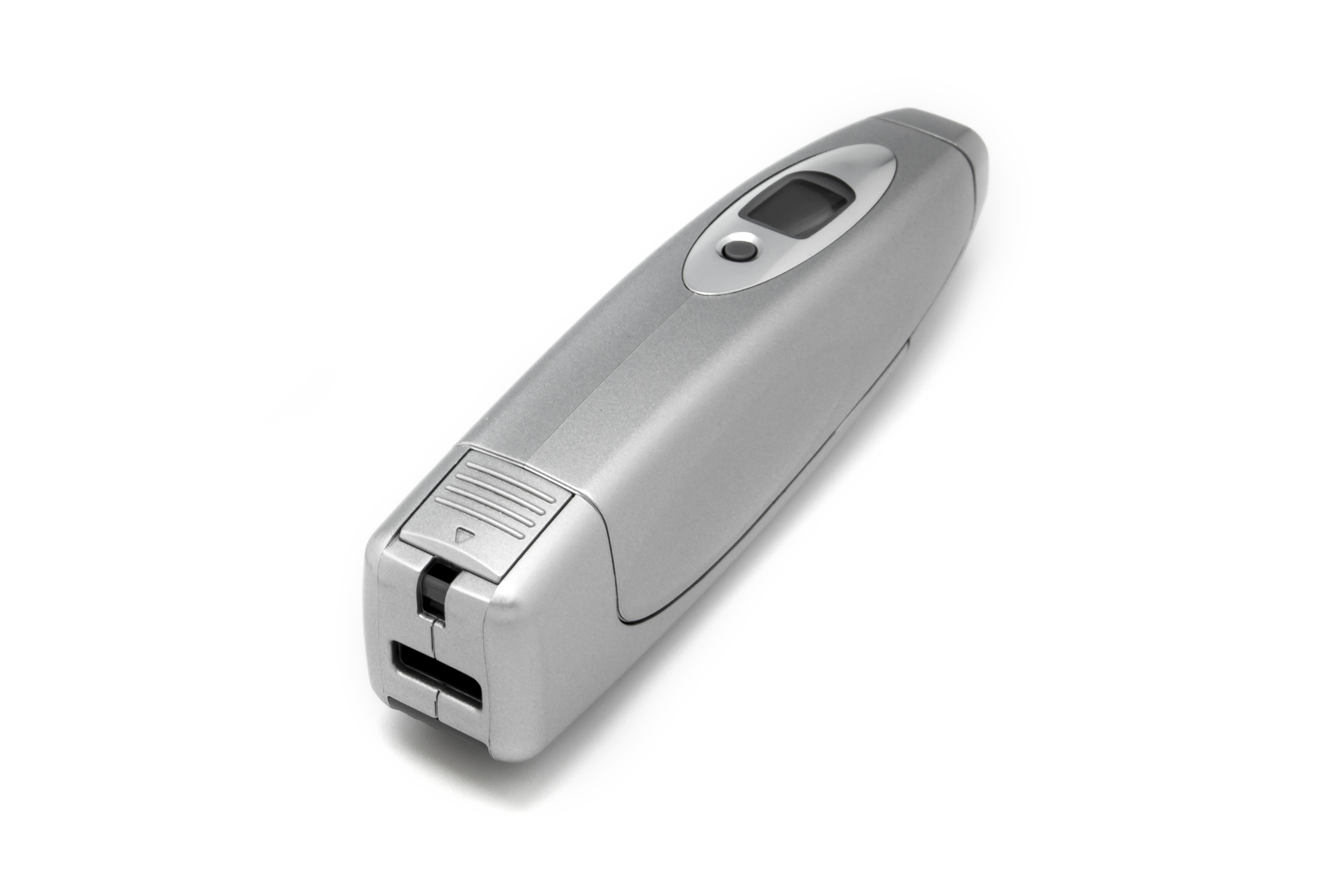
Philip Morris' Heatbar pictured without a specifically designed cigarette.

As early as the 1960s, tobacco companies began developing alternative tobacco products to supplement the cigarette market. The first commercial HTP was the Premier by R. J. Reynolds, a smokeless cigarette launched in 1988 that was widely described as difficult to use. Many smokers disliked its taste, and it was not popular during test marketing in Arizona and Missouri. The product resembled a traditional cigarette and required combustion to move smoldered charcoal past processed tobacco containing more than 50% glycerin to produce an aerosol.

In 1989, after spending $325 million on development, R. J. Reynolds withdrew the Premier following recommendations from the American Medical Association and other organizations that the US Food and Drug Administration (FDA) restrict or classify it as a drug.

The Premier concept was later revised and reintroduced as the Eclipse in the mid-1990s. The Eclipse remained available in limited distribution as of 2015, and was promoted through viral marketing. Reynolds American later introduced Revo, describing it as a repositioned Eclipse, but the Revo was withdrawn in 2015.

The Steam Hot One was sold in Japan by Japan Tobacco.

In October 1998, Philip Morris launched the Accord in the United States. It was a specialized cigarette designed for use with an electric heating system. Advertisements suggesting reduced risk were drafted but never released. The company also launched the Accord in Osaka, Japan, renaming it Oasis. The battery-powered, pager-sized product was marketed as a "low-smoke" option. In 2007, Kenneth Podraza, then Vice President of Research and Development at Philip Morris USA, sought endorsement from the Surgeon General of the United States, but received no response. Few consumers adopted the Accord, and many who did continued using traditional cigarettes. Production ended in 2006.

In 2007, Philip Morris International introduced the Heatbar, a product similar to the Accord. About the size of a mobile phone, it heated specially designed cigarettes rather than burning them. The Heatbar failed to generate significant consumer interest, and was discontinued after studies reported its only notable benefit was reduced second-hand smoke. Both the Accord and Heatbar are considered precursors to Philip Morris International's current HTPs. Many early HTPs were not commercially successful and were withdrawn shortly after launch.

Leading up to 2018, increasing tobacco control measures prompted the tobacco industry to develop alternative tobacco products such as HTPs. A global decline in tobacco consumption—which threatens industry profits—has also driven companies to create and promote new products. The introduction of HTPs may have been influenced by the rapid rise of e-cigarettes beginning around 2007, initially led by independent companies before multinational tobacco firms entered the market.

Falling global cigarette consumption and declining adult smoking prevalence (from 24% in 2007 to 21% in 2015), combined with the implementation of measures such as the WHO Framework Convention on Tobacco Control, may have encouraged tobacco companies to pursue alternative products to maintain profits and political influence. T. L. Caputi argues that the widespread availability of e-cigarettes and dissatisfaction among some users with a lack of "throat-hit" could create opportunities for HTPs. Philip Morris International has expressed interest in a future without traditional cigarettes, although public health campaigners and industry analysts have questioned the likelihood that e-cigarettes or products like IQOS will replace them.

== Health effects ==
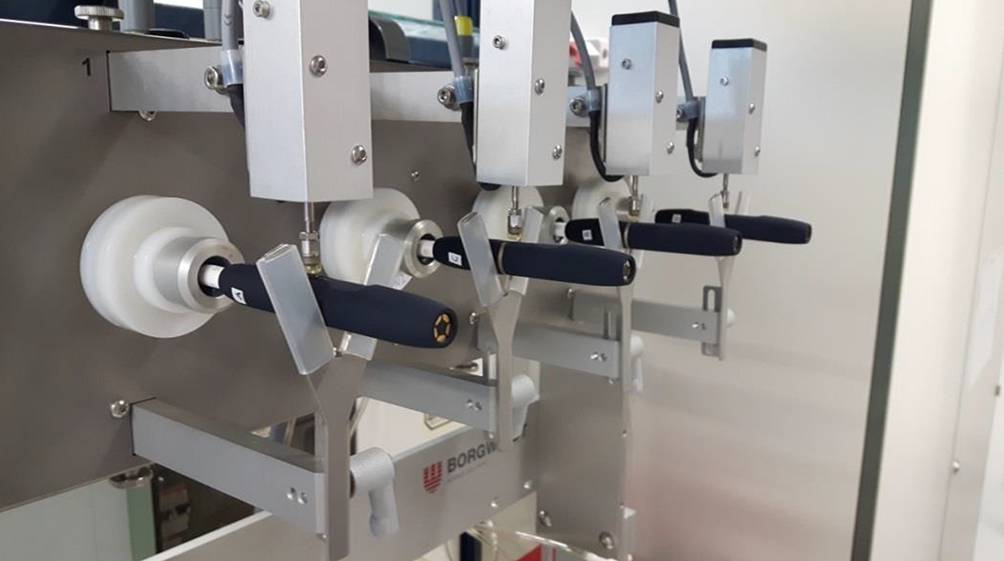
E-cigarette emissions machine with heated tobacco products. The emissions of four heated tobacco products can be generated in parallel in an emissions experiment. The emissions are analyzed using appropriate analytical techniques, allowing comparison among different products.

A 2016 Cochrane review found that it was unclear whether the use of heated tobacco products (HTPs) would “substantially alter the risk of harm” compared with traditional cigarettes. In the same year, a World Health Organization report stated that claims of reduced harm from HTPs were based largely on industry-funded research, and independent evidence to support these claims was lacking. It also reported evidence indicating that HTPs may be as dangerous as traditional cigarettes.

In 2016, Action on Smoking and Health (UK) emphasized the need for independent research, citing "the tobacco industry's long record of deceit" regarding the health risks of smoking. As of December 2017, it remained impossible to quantify the health risks of HTP use due to the limited amount of available health data. The short- and long-term adverse effects of HTPs were also unclear. As of 2019, only a limited number of independent studies had been conducted on HTPs, and further research was expected to improve understanding of their health effects.

The wide variety of HTP designs poses challenges for researchers, as different products may produce different effects. One study found that about half of users believed HTPs to be safer than traditional cigarettes.

Given the wide range of electronic cigarette products in the UK, it remains unclear whether HTPs provide any notable benefit as harm reduction devices. A 2018 Public Health England report stated that HTPs may be significantly safer than traditional cigarettes but less safe than e-cigarettes. A 2017 non-technical summary by the Committee on Toxicity recommended that smokers should completely stop using tobacco, even though HTPs were assessed as being less harmful than smoking conventional cigarettes.

A 2022 Cochrane review found evidence that measured toxin levels were lower in people using heated tobacco products than in those smoking cigarettes, although such levels may still be higher than in people not using any tobacco products.

=== Emissions ===
Heated tobacco products expose users and bystanders to an aerosol. The aerosol contains levels of nicotine, volatile organic compounds, and carcinogens comparable to those in regular cigarettes and has been found to contain higher levels of acenaphthene than cigarette smoke. Other substances typically associated with cigarette emissions—such as tar, nicotine, carbonyl compounds (including acetaldehyde, acrolein, and formaldehyde), and nitrosamines—are also found in HTP emissions. A 2017 study found that indoor use of HTPs increased air levels of carbon monoxide and formaldehyde by 10 percent.

Another 2017 study reported that HTPs generate emissions containing metal particulates, organic compounds, and aldehydes, and found that airborne contaminant concentrations were lower than those produced by traditional cigarettes, though HTP use still decreases indoor air quality.

A 2018 Public Health England report stated that, compared with cigarettes, HTPs are likely to expose users and bystanders to lower levels of particulate matter and harmful and potentially harmful compounds (HPHCs), though the degree of reduction varies across studies. The report also found that less nicotine is typically inhaled from HTPs than from cigarette smoke, and that exposure to mutagenic and other harmful substances is lower. However, reduced exposure does not necessarily correlate with reduced health risk. Low levels of exposure can also raise the risk of cancers, stroke, and other cardiovascular diseases compared with non-smokers. Although lower emissions have been observed, there was no evidence as of 2018 that switching to HTPs reduces overall risk for smokers. In 2017, the Committee on Toxicity reported that HTPs do not reduce exposure to, or the potential for addiction to, nicotine; several inhaled substances remain carcinogenic.

Physiological responses to heated tobacco emissions, including inflammation, metabolic changes, and carcinogenesis across multiple organ systems, are not well characterised due to limited research, particularly in animal models. A 2018 in vitro study found a less harmful pathophysiological response in human organotypic oral epithelial cultures exposed to HTP emissions. A 2016 animal study reported that HTP emissions did not increase surfactant lipids and proteins, inflammatory eicosanoids, metabolic enzymes, or various ceramide classes in exposed mice compared with those exposed to cigarette smoke. The study also noted that excessive use (40 sticks per day) can lead to eosinophilic pneumonia in humans despite reduced toxicant levels.

The population-level impact of HTP emissions is unclear. As of 2018, studies on second-hand HTP emissions varied widely and were often affiliated with manufacturers. There is disagreement over the extent and composition of HTP emissions. A reduced risk to bystanders is expected where HTPs are used instead of cigarettes. Limited evidence suggests that toxic exposure from HTP emissions is higher than from e-cigarettes. Because no safe level of exposure to carcinogens exists, it is difficult to determine how much HTPs reduce health risks overall.

=== Addiction and quitting ===
HTPs contain the highly addictive chemical nicotine. The nicotine content of HTP emissions is similar to that of traditional cigarette smoke, suggesting a comparable potential for addiction and dependence. There is insufficient evidence on whether HTPs are effective for quitting smoking.

A 2018 World Health Organization report stated that "[c]onclusions cannot yet be drawn about their ability to assist with quitting smoking (cessation), their potential to attract new youth tobacco users (gateway effect), or the interaction in dual use with other conventional tobacco products and e-cigarettes." In 2017, the New Zealand Ministry of Health noted that there was "limited information on product use, including whether smokers are likely to switch completely from tobacco smoking or use both types of products, as well as initiation by non-smokers (including young people)." The same year, the Committee on Toxicity expressed concern that non-smokers, including children and young people, might begin using HTPs, despite the products not being risk-free.

The availability of flavours in HTPs may appeal to non-smokers, and evidence indicates that individuals who have never used tobacco products—particularly children and adolescents—may be susceptible to trying HTPs, potentially leading to subsequent traditional cigarette use. In 2017, the Committee on Toxicity further noted concern for young people initiating HTP use, given their longer potential lifetime exposure and possible increased sensitivity to nicotine.

Dual use of HTPs and combustible cigarettes is common. Trying HTPs is more frequent among adults under 30 and among regular cigarette smokers. A 2015 online survey found that 6.6% of 8,240 respondents had tried an HTP at least once. Research has shown a high overlap between HTP users and female smokers.

Four epidemiological studies reported that 10–45% of HTP users were non-smokers, with findings interpreted as evidence of marketing effectiveness by the tobacco industry. For example, use of IQOS reportedly functions more often as a gateway to traditional cigarette use (20%) than as a quitting tool (11%), with the remaining 69% being dual users; no reduced risk has been established for these users. In 2016, Philip Morris International acknowledged that IQOS is likely as addictive as traditional smoking. IQOS packaging includes a warning stating that avoiding tobacco products entirely is the best option.

IQOS devices can record user behaviour. Although Philip Morris International states that data are retrieved only when the device malfunctions, Gregory Connolly of Northeastern University suggested that tobacco companies could develop a "mega database" of smoking habits and potentially adjust puff delivery patterns to increase reinforcement and addiction potential.

As of July 2017, HTP awareness and use in the United States remained low; approximately one in twenty adults had heard of HTPs, including one in ten cigarette smokers. In Italy, HTP use was 1.4% among the general population and 3.1% among regular tobacco users. A 2018 Italian survey found that 45% of people who had experimented with IQOS, and 51% of those interested in IQOS, had never smoked before. In this context, HTPs may represent a gateway to nicotine addiction for never-smokers rather than a harm reduction alternative for current ones.

In Germany, HTP use is uncommon and tends to be concentrated among wealthier and more educated smokers. In Japan, where HTPs have been sold since 2014, use has been high. A 2017 survey in Japan found that, among recent IQOS users, 20% had never smoked before. Eighty-six percent of IQOS users reported that the product did not satisfy them, and they continued smoking traditional cigarettes alongside IQOS. HTP use among youth remains uncertain, though monitoring is underway as of March 2019.

=== Nicotine yield ===
Limited data on HTP users indicate that they tend to take short puffs with very brief intervals between them. Experimental tests also show a higher number of puffs at shorter intervals compared with traditional cigarettes. A 2018 clinical trial found that smokers switching to IQOS demonstrated a tendency to take more frequent puffs at shorter intervals.

Users generally reach peak blood nicotine levels within six to seven minutes when using either HTPs or traditional cigarettes. IQOS devices produce slightly lower overall blood nicotine levels than traditional cigarettes but higher levels than nicotine gum. A 2016 study found that smokers reported lower satisfaction and a smaller reduction in cravings when using IQOS compared with traditional cigarettes. In that study, participants who switched to an HTP often smoked more traditional cigarettes after an initial adjustment period than those who did not switch, while also reporting that HTPs were less satisfying and rewarding than conventional cigarettes.

Sharper peaks in blood nicotine levels caused by inhalation contribute to greater nicotine dependence compared with oral consumption. Nicotine replacement products deliver nicotine more slowly and steadily, which is associated with lower addictive potential. Inhaled nicotine enters the bloodstream more rapidly than orally consumed nicotine, and blood nicotine levels decline by half every one to two hours. Nicotine withdrawal can lead to deteriorating mood and increased cravings for nicotine intake.

=== Pregnancy ===
Pregnant women who wish to quit smoking but are unable to do so often have limited options. Because nicotine replacement products are often ineffective for smoking cessation during pregnancy, some pregnant women turn to HTPs as an alternative. As of 2018, no information was available on the potential impact of HTP emissions on the fetus. The risk to the fetus from HTP use during pregnancy is difficult to quantify; although it is likely lower than the risk from traditional cigarette smoking, the Committee on Toxicity recommends that expectant mothers stop smoking entirely. Nicotine is harmful to the infant and the developing adolescent brain. It is metabolised more rapidly during pregnancy, along with being able to cross the placental barrier and accumulating in breast milk. Evidence links nicotine exposure during pregnancy to premature birth, stillbirth, and abnormal brain development. Nicotine exposure may also adversely affect fetal neurological development.

Nicotine can cause vasoconstriction of uteroplacental vessels, reducing the delivery of nutrients and oxygen to the fetus. This may redirect nutrients toward vital organs such as the heart and brain at the expense of other organs, potentially resulting in underdevelopment and functional disorders later in life. Animal studies of maternal nicotine exposure in rats have shown adverse effects on pancreatic development, including reduced endocrine pancreatic islet size and number, decreased expression of certain transcription factors, and reduced levels of hormones such as insulin and glucagon. Affected offspring displayed pancreatic dysfunction and glucose intolerance. Other animal studies have reported insulin resistance in adult offspring following maternal nicotine exposure. Nicotine has also been shown to activate nicotinic acetylcholine receptors (nAChRs) in the brain, which influence neural development. In rat models, first-trimester nicotine exposure (2 mg/kg/day) has been associated with structural changes in the hippocampus and somatosensory cortex.

== Construction ==
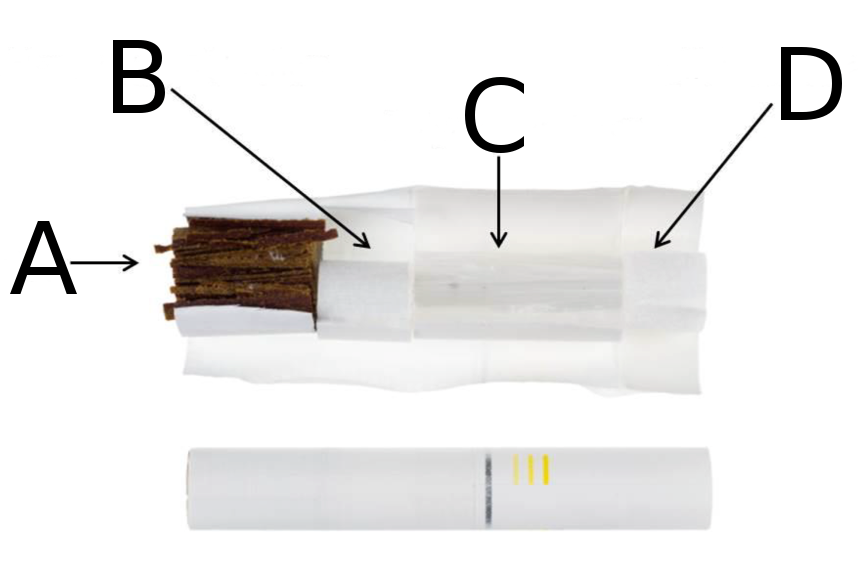
Tobacco stick; above, disassembled, below, intact. A: Reconstituted tobacco film made of dried tobacco suspension. The film contains about 70% tobacco, humectants (water and glycerin) to encourage aerosol formation, binding agents, and aroma agents. B: Hollow acetate tube. C: Polymer film filter that cools the aerosol. D: Soft cellulose acetate mouthpiece designed to mimic the feel of a traditional cigarette.

Nicotine is released from tobacco heated above 150 °C. The burning process, the substances emitted, and their levels vary at different temperatures. Distillation—during which nicotine and aromas transfer from tobacco to smoke—occurs below 300 °C. Pyrolysis occurs at approximately 300–700 °C and involves the decomposition of biopolymers, proteins, and other organic materials, generating many of the substances found in smoke. Combustion occurs above 750 °C and results in the formation of carbon dioxide, carbon monoxide, and water.

The temperature reached by the tobacco varies considerably among HTPs, depending on the heating mechanism. For example, HeatSticks are heated to a maximum of about 350 °C, which is sufficient to permit pyrolytic decomposition of some organic materials, whereas the glo iFuse heats tobacco to around 35 °C. The formation of toxic volatile organic compounds—including formaldehyde, acetaldehyde, and acrolein—has been reported in e-cigarette aerosols at temperatures similar to those of IQOS devices; flavoring chemicals in e-cigarettes have been found to undergo thermal degradation and contribute to aldehyde emissions. Emissions may also include carbon monoxide (CO), nitrogen oxides, soot or tars, and aldehydes. Gaseous, liquid, and solid particles are present in emissions; solid residues have been described as nicotine-free dry particulate matter in studies authored by individuals associated with the tobacco industry.

Because the constituents of HeatSticks differ from those of combustible cigarettes—including the use of flavourants and additives—it is plausible that IQOS aerosol contains substances not found in conventional tobacco smoke. The emissions from IQOS HeatSticks and menthol mini-cigarettes contain approximately three times more water and about half as much tar as traditional cigarette smoke. IQOS HeatSticks do not produce a flame but become charred after use. Until 2016, researchers at Philip Morris International described IQOS emissions as "smoke".

HTPs generally consist of three components: a processed tobacco stick, a pen-like heater (holder) into which the stick is inserted and warmed by an electrically controlled heating element, and a charger that recharges the heater. Many devices automatically stop heating after six minutes or 14 puffs to limit pyrolytic products and pollutant release by time and puff count. HTPs do not fully combust tobacco and therefore may not generate sidestream smoke, although temperatures reached are sufficient for pyrolysis.

Some devices use reactions resembling pyrolysis or combustion, but research has not clearly determined which process occurs. The tobacco stick contains a compressed tobacco film made from a dried tobacco suspension rolled into a thin brown foil, along with several filter elements. This film consists of about 70% tobacco, humectants (such as water and glycerin) to prevent drying and promote aerosol formation, binders, and flavorings. The filter includes two components: a polymer film filter that cools the aerosol and a soft cellulose acetate mouthpiece that replicates the sensory feel of a cigarette.

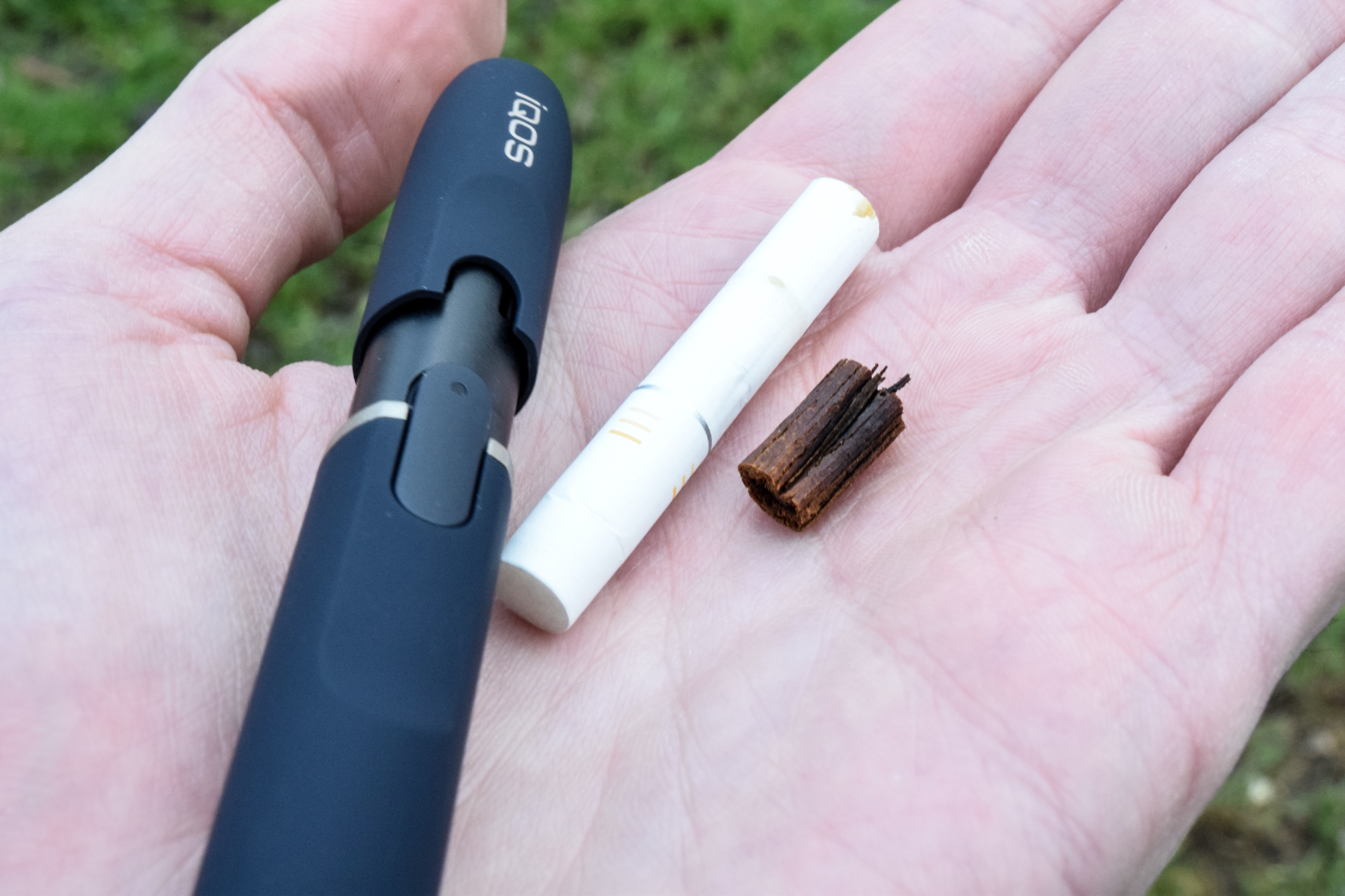
Charred tobacco after use.

HTPs are battery-powered systems that produce nicotine-containing emissions by heating tobacco. Tobacco sticks are inserted into a heating device and warmed to approximately 250–350 °C (about 500 °F), creating nicotine-containing aerosol inhaled through a mouthpiece with a filter segment. HTPs are considered hybrids between electronic and conventional cigarettes: they heat processed tobacco without reaching combustion to generate aerosol, while using tobacco rather than nicotine liquids. Some devices operate with a time limit that requires users to inhale nicotine within 3.5–10 minutes before the device powers off. This mechanism supports blood-nicotine peaks associated with increased nicotine dependence.

Three general types of heated tobacco products have been described. One type heats processed tobacco directly to generate aerosol; another heats processed tobacco but does not itself generate the aerosol; and a third allows processed tobacco to impart flavor to aerosol as it passes over it. Another category is the loose-leaf tobacco vaporizer, which involves placing loose-leaf tobacco into an electrically heated chamber.

== Products ==
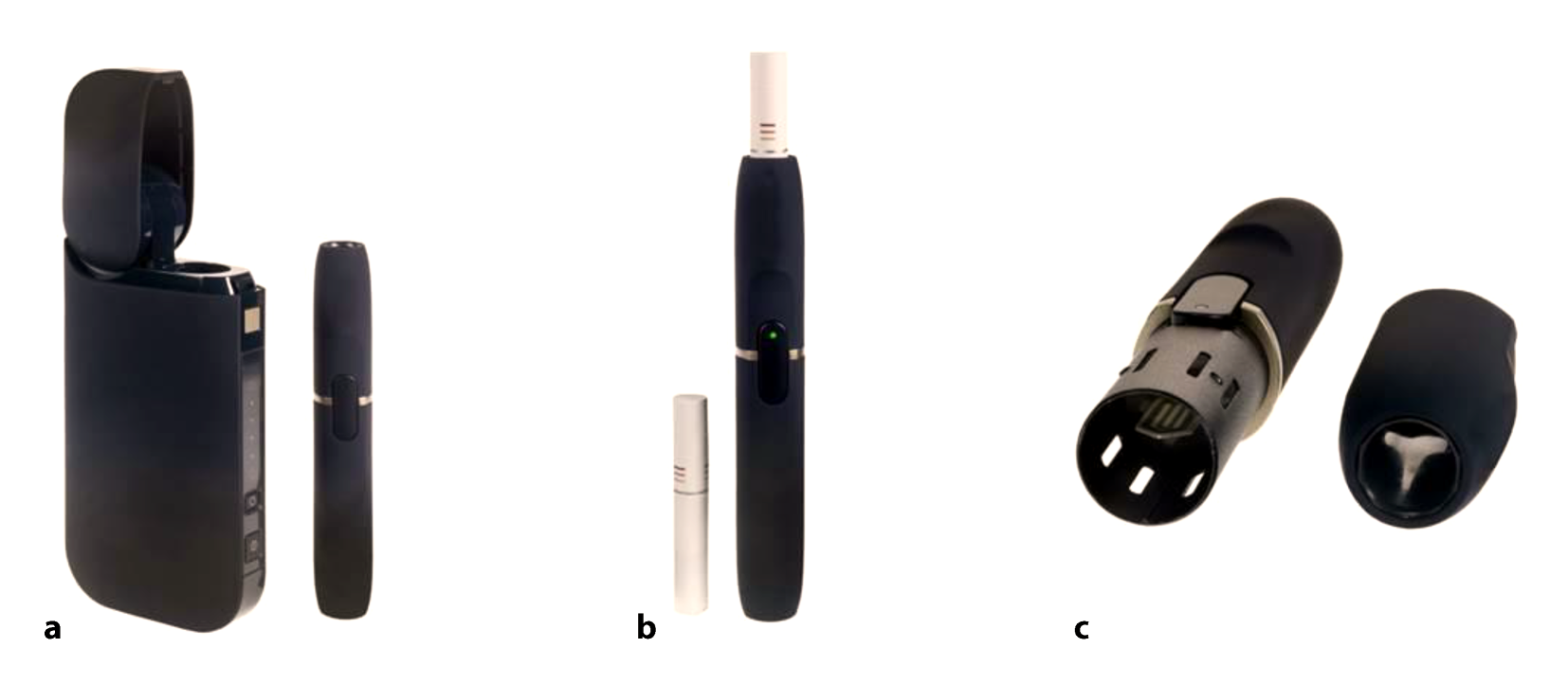
Heated tobacco product. a) Charger (left) and holder (right), b) Tobacco stick (left) and holder with tobacco stick inserted (right), c) Disassembled holder, with heating element visible (left) and the holder's lid (right).

HTPs use a heating system where the tobacco is heated and aerosolised. In addition to nicotine, they contain additives that are flavoured and derived from substances other than tobacco. Evidence shows that the concentrations of nicotine in mainstream HTP aerosols are lower than in cigarette smoke. Smokers regularly reported HTP use to be less satisfying than smoking a cigarette. Tested HTPs provided more nicotine in the aerosol than a cigalike e-cigarette but not as much nicotine compared with a tank-style e-cigarette.

HTPs are designed to be similar to their combustible counterparts by replicating the oral inhalation and exhalation, taste, rapid systemic delivery of nicotine, hand-to-mouth feel and throat hit sensations (depending on the temperature) when smoking traditional cigarettes. HTPs aim for a niche between combustible tobacco smoking and e-cigarettes that aerosolise nicotine. There are different types of HTPs in the marketplace: some use tobacco sticks like glo and IQOS, while others use loose-leaf tobacco such as Pax and Ploom.

=== Firefly vaporizers ===
The Firefly developed the Firefly 2, which heats loose-leaf plant material and concentrates and is often used to aerosolise cannabis, and is more compact than the original Firefly vaporizer. It uses a patented heating technology that heats the device up to the desired temperature (between 200 and 500 °F) with each puff rather than a preset temperature setting from the beginning.

=== Glo ===
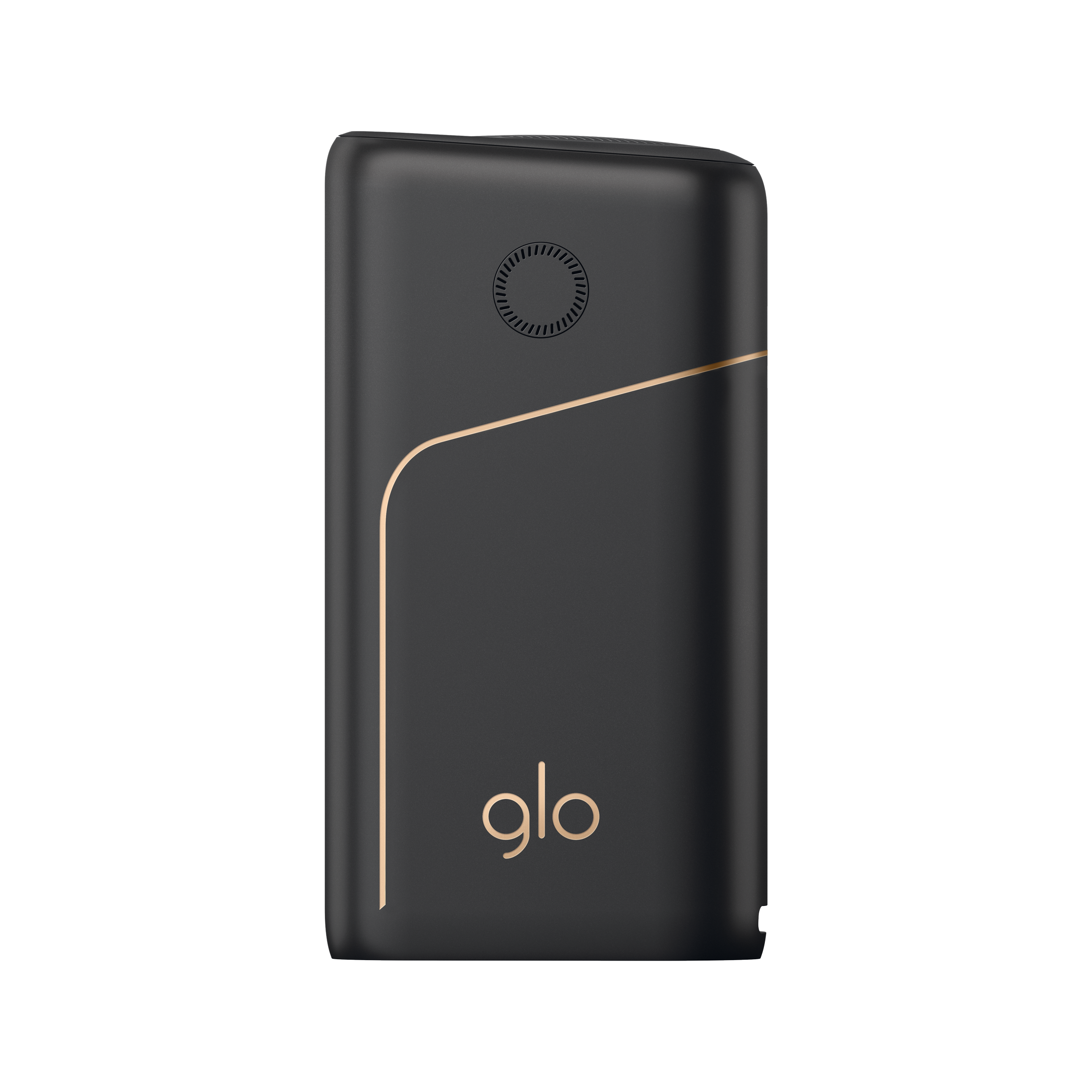
Glo, the tobacco heating device of British American Tobacco.

In 2016, British American Tobacco launched a battery-powered heated product called glo in Japan before selling it in South Korea, Switzerland, Russia, and Ukraine. In France, glo uses tobacco sticks called Neostiks. It uses a heating element with a tobacco stick that heats up to 240 °C. glo produces approximately 50% less nicotine emissions than IQOS. In May 2017 British American Tobacco released i-glo in Canada. Bonnie Herzog, a senior analyst at Wells Fargo Securities, stated that the proposed acquisition of R. J. Reynolds by British American Tobacco in 2016 would let them catch up with the competition. glo is marketed as being easier to operate than IQOS.

The glo iFuse debuted in Romania in 2015, and is a hybrid of a heated tobacco product and an e-cigarette. It consists of a heating element, a liquid tank (like e-cigarettes), and a tobacco cavity through which the aerosol passes and is infused with tobacco flavour. It uses cartridges called Neopods, and heats tobacco to approximately 35 °C.

=== IQOS ===
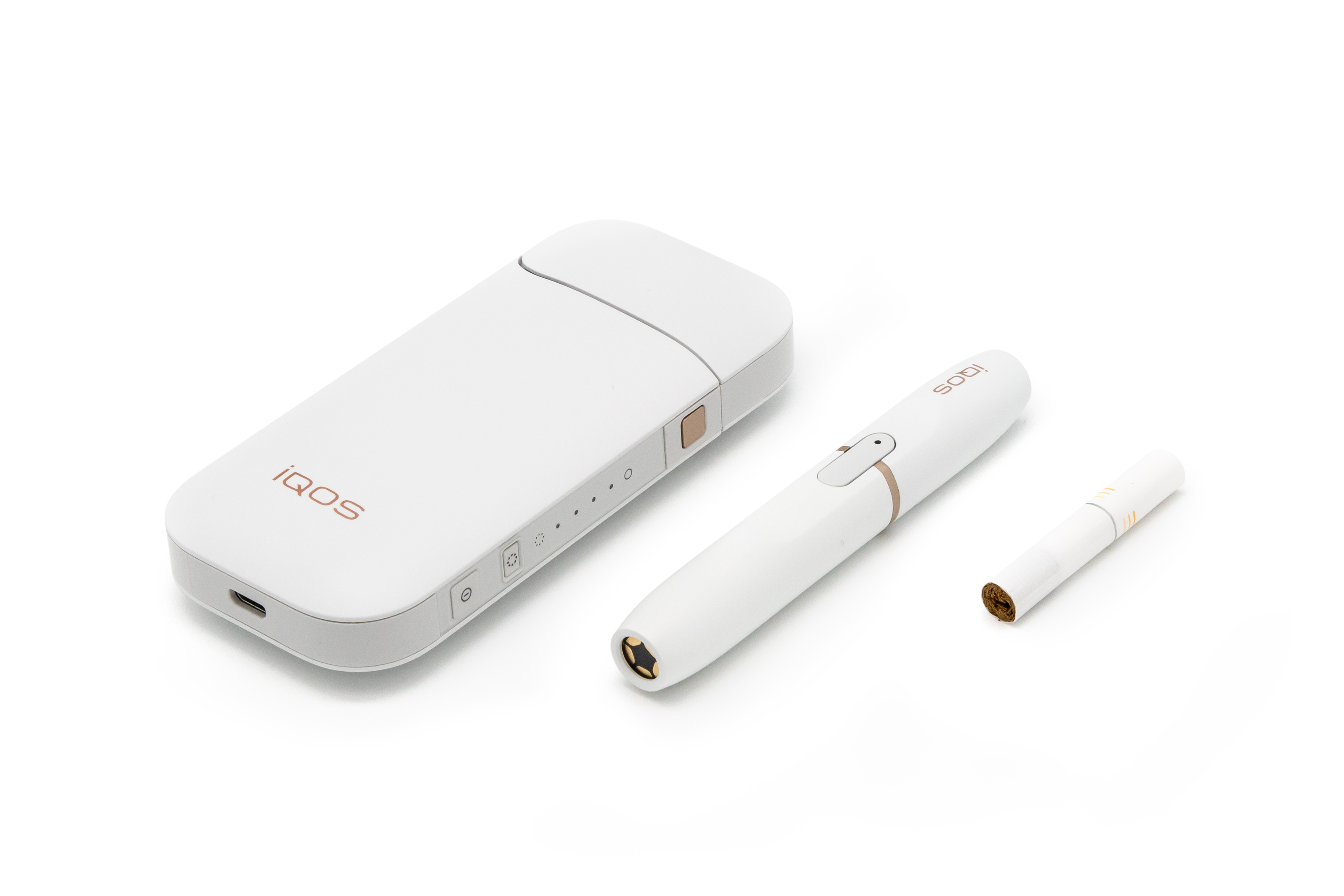
IQOS, consisting of a charger, a heater and a small tobacco cigarette.

IQOS (/ˈaɪkoʊs/ EYE-kohs) is a non-combustible "reduced risk" smoking alternative that was introduced in June 2014 and is marketed by Philip Morris International (PMI) under the Marlboro and Parliament brands. Although it is marketed as a novel product, it is very similar to the Accord released by the same company in 1998; however, the IQOS sticks have more nicotine, more tar, and less tobacco. They are heated at a lower temperature.

Initially launched in 2014 in Nagoya, Japan, and Milan, Italy, IQOS is being introduced to other countries, and as of October 2019, it is available in 49 countries. PMI has projected that when 30 billions units are sold, IQOS would increase profits by $700 million. In October 2018, PMI introduced a less expensive version of IQOS called IQOS 3 in Tokyo, Japan. The IQOS 3 Multi was also launched and is capable of multiple consecutive uses.

The IQOS consists of a charger around the size of a mobile phone and a pen-like holder. The disposable tobacco stick, also known as a HeatStick, is described as a mini-cigarette. The sticks contain processed tobacco soaked in propylene glycol. The stick is inserted into the holder which then heats it to temperatures of up to 350 °C, and the amount of nicotine provided may be a little strong for light cigarette smokers. Users have reported less smell and odor on clothing.

The physical effects on users are not yet known, and there is limited research on the topic. The emissions of IQOS are considered to be smoke by independent researchers and were called smoke by Phillip Morris researchers until 2016. The emissions generated by IQOS contain the same harmful constituents as tobacco cigarette smoke, including volatile organic compounds at comparable levels to cigarette smoke, polycyclic aromatic hydrocarbons, and carbon monoxide. Each of these substances, on the basis of rigorous research on cigarette smoke, are known to result in significant harms to health. According to the National Institute for Public Health and the Environment in the Netherlands, IQOS is "harmful to health, but probably less harmful than smoking tobacco cigarettes".

In 2016, PMI submitted a multi-million page application to the US FDA for IQOS to be authorized as a modified risk tobacco product. In March 2017, PMI submitted a premarket tobacco product application regarding its IQOS product to the FDA. In December 2017, Reuters published documents and testimonies of former employees detailing irregularities in the clinical trials conducted by PMI for the approval of the IQOS product by the FDA. The advisory panel appointed by the FDA reviewed Philip Morris International's application in January 2018. The FDA granted permission to PMI to sell IQOS in the US on 30 April 2019, which also requires the company to follow strict marketing restrictions. IQOS formally launched in the US in October 2019. On 7 July 2020, the FDA announced its ruling 456, which granted an "exposure modification" order that allows PMI to market IQOS in the United States.

=== iSmoke OneHitter ===
The iSmoke OneHitter by iSmoke can be used as a loose-leaf tobacco vaporizer or for use with waxy oils. It is described as a "heat, not burn" tobacco vaporizer, and was launched in 2015. It has a chamber that can be filled with up to 800 milligrams of tobacco.

=== IUOC 2 ===
The IUOC 2 is marketed by Shenzhen Yukan Technology Co., Limited, of China. The HTP can use any pack of 20 cigarettes on a single battery charge and does not use tobacco-filled cartridges. It is an updated version over the original IUOC and was formally launched in 2018 at InterTabac in Germany.

=== lil ===
The lil is an HTP that heats a cigarette stick with a circular blade that was launched by the Korea Tobacco & Ginseng Corporation on 20 November 2017. According to the company, a two-hour battery charge lasts for up to 20 cigarette sticks, its refills are cheaper than the IQOS and glo, and will fit in the IQOS product, though they do not recommend doing so for safety reasons.

=== Mok ===
In May 2019, China Tobacco debuted the Mok in South Korea. According to the company, Mok is more compact and weighs less than other products such as glo, IQOS, and lil. The Coo sticks are longer and wider than tobacco sticks from other companies.

=== Pax vaporizers ===
In 2010, the company Ploom (later rebranded as Pax Labs) launched a butane-powered product used to heat tobacco or botanical products. Later models replaced the butane heating with an electric system. The Pax 2 vaporizer uses loose plant material such as tobacco or cannabis and remains cool to the touch while the oven heats to one of four temperatures (up to 455 °F). The Pax 3 takes 15 seconds to heat up and can be used to heat cannabis flowers.

=== Ploom ===
In January 2016, Japan Tobacco released Ploom, which has been withdrawn from the US. The brand remained with Japan Tobacco and the product has been replaced with Ploom Tech, where an aerosol passes through a capsule of granulated tobacco leaves. The Ploom brand uses aluminum capsules called Vapodes, where tobacco can heat up to 180 °C. Because the Ploom Tech heats up to a higher temperature, it may generate more harmful emissions. In January 2019, Japan Tobacco introduced Ploom TECH+ and Ploom S in Tokyo, Japan.

Sales expanded throughout Japan in 2017. Japan Tobacco intended to spend $500 million to increase their heated tobacco manufacturing capacity by late 2018. Studies have not been conducted on Japan Tobacco International's Ploom product as of 2017.

=== Pulze ===
Pulze is a heated tobacco device developed by Imperial Brands. The system is designed to heat specially designed tobacco sticks, known as iD, without burning them, generating an aerosol that contains nicotine. Pulze operates with two heating settings: an “Intense” mode, which reaches temperatures of up to approximately 345 °C, and a “Gentle” mode, which operates at approximately 315 °C, both below the combustion threshold of tobacco.

The Pulze device, together with the iD sticks, was first introduced in 2021 through a pilot launch in the Czech Republic. In 2023, Imperial Brands introduced Pulze 2.0, an updated version of the device without an external charging case and with increased battery capacity, initially available in selected European markets, including Italy, Poland, the Czech Republic and Greece.

In 2024, the company introduced iSENZIA, nicotine sticks made from tea leaves that do not contain tobacco and are designed for use with the Pulze device.

On 18 September 2025, Imperial Brands announced the launch of Pulze 3.0, with updates to the design, internal technology and usability.

=== TEEPS ===
In December 2017, PMI launched TEEPS in the Dominican Republic. It is an HTP that looks similar to a traditional cigarette. Instead of an electrically controlled heating system, it uses a carbon heat source that, once lit, passes heat to a processed tobacco plug.

=== Cigoo ===
In September 2020, Yunnan Xike Science & Technology Co., Ltd. launched Cigoo; according to the company, it is a heated herbal product which releases nicotine and aroma aerosol at 300 °C, similar to mainstream HTPs. Instead of using reconstituted tobacco film in the stick, Cigoo sticks use patented plant particle as a carrier, added flavourants and additives.

=== TEO ===
The TEO heats a cigarette stick with a heating blade and was launched by Shenzhen ESON Technology Co. Ltd. ("ESON") in Dec. 2021 after PODA. NEAFS tobacco-free sticks does not use tobacco, but instead a nicotine infused, tea-based organic compound.

== Comparison to mainstream smoke of traditional cigarettes ==
The table below shows the contents of selected analytes in the mainstream aerosol of a heated tobacco product compared to the mainstream smoke of traditional cigarettes. The highest and lowest values in two different types of tobacco sticks and traditional cigarettes were given by Mallock et al. and Counts et al. respectively. Column 5 shows the reduction of the analytes in the mainstream aerosol of the heated tobacco product compared to traditional cigarettes by percentage.

		Tobacco sticks (Mallock et al. 2018; [15])	Traditional Cigarettes (Counts et al. 2005; [18])	Reduction
Parameter	Unit	Min.–Max.	Min.–Max.	%
Puff count	puff/stick	12	5.5–13.6	–
TPM	mg/stick	51.2–52.6	27.5–60.9	–
Nicotine	mg/stick	1.1	1.07–2.70	–
Water	mg/stick	28.0–31.7	9.8–21.4	–
NFDPM	mg/stick	19.8–21.6	16.3–37.6	–
Acetaldehyde	μg/stick	179.4–183.5	930–1540	80.5–88.2
Acrolein	μg/stick	8.9–9.9	89.2–154.1	89.5–93.9
Formaldehyde	μg/stick	4.7–5.3	29.3–130.3	82.9–96.2
Crotonaldehyde	μg/stick	<3.0	32.7–70.8	–
1.3-Butadiene	μg/stick	0.20–0.2	77.0–116.7	99.7–99.8
Benzine	μg/stick	0.5–0.6	49.7–98.3	98.8–99.4
Isoprene	μg/stick	1.8–2.1	509–1160	99.6–99.8
Styrene	μg/stick	0.5	15.4–33.3	96.9–98.6
Toluene	μg/stick	2.0–2.2	86.2–176.2	97.6–98.8

Tobacco stick, i.e. for heated tobacco products: a tobacco stick; for traditional cigarette: a cigarette.
All values were generated using the Health Canada Intense (HCI) puffing conditions.
TPM = total particulate matter, and NFDPM = nicotine-free dried particulate matter.

== Prevalence ==
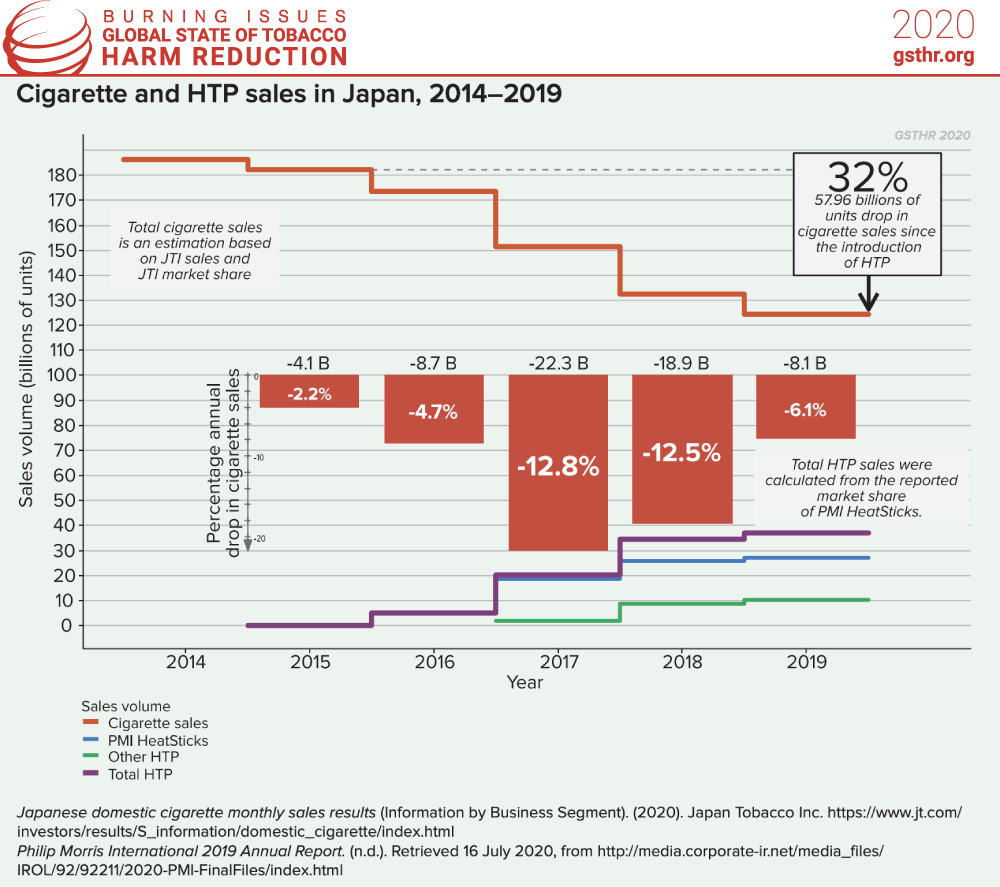
Rapid fall in cigarette sales associated with the rise of HTP sales in Japan: from Burning Issues: The Global State of Tobacco Harm Reduction

As of 2017, HTPs are being introduced in markets around the world, and since October 2019, they have been sold in at least 49 countries. They are not as globally popular as the e-cigarette, which has an estimated global user count of 20 million. As of 2018, the IQOS is the most popular product, and was authorised for marketing by the FDA in the US on 30 April 2019.

As of January 2018, the industry has been rapidly introducing new heated tobacco products. HTPs were first sold in Japan, and several brands have been marketed there since 2014. Since the introduction of HTP in Japan there has been a 32% drop in the sale of tobacco cigarettes.

The share of the market in South Korea for heated tobacco products has surged at least five-fold during the last two years leading up to 2019. As of early 2018, these products are not sold in France.

Tobacco industry leaders predict that HTPs may displace traditional cigarette smoking and, by extension, tobacco control strategies typically framed around cigarettes.

Since the introduction of PMI's IQOS brand in select Japanese cities in November 2014, web searches in Japan for "heat-not-burn products" (a marketing name for HTPs) increased substantially; average monthly searches rose 1,426% (95% CI: 746–3,574) during 2015–2016, and they continued to grow an additional 100% (95% CI: 60–173) between 2016 and 2017; in practical terms, there are now between 5.9 and 7.5 million heat-not-burn related Google searches in Japan each month based on the latest search estimates for September 2017. Moreover, forecasts relying on the historical trend suggest heat-not-burn searches would increase an additional 32% (95%CI: -4 to 79) during 2018, compared to current estimates for 2017 (January–September), with further growth expected.

Queries for heat-not-burn in Japan occur more frequently than queries for e-cigarettes in the United States, with the Japanese heat-not-burn queries first eclipsing e-cigarette queries in April 2016. Further, the change in average monthly queries for heat-not-burn in Japan between 2015 and 2017 was 399 (95% CI: 184–1,490) times larger than the change in average monthly queries for e-cigarettes in the United States over the same time period, increasing by 2,956% (95% CI: 1,729–7,304) compared to only 7% (95% CI: 3–13), which indicate that interest in heat-not-burn may outpace interest in e-cigarettes in the future.

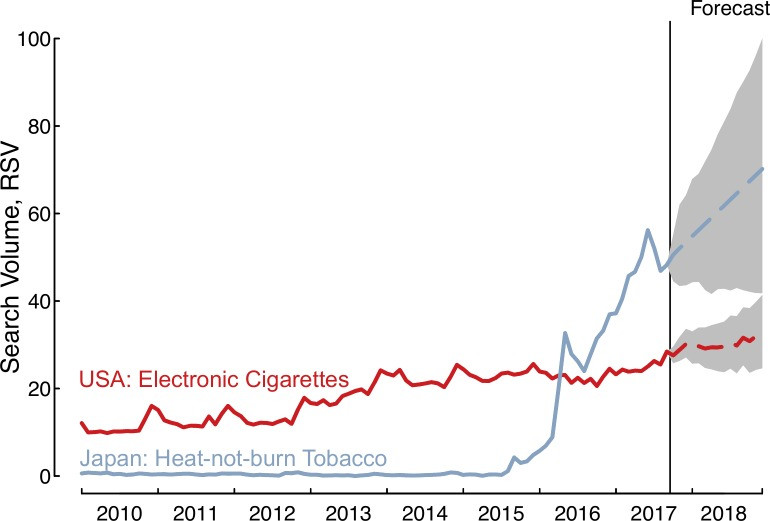
Google searches for heat-not-burn tobacco (heated tobacco) outpace rise of electronic cigarettes. The above figure shows the Relative Search Volume (scaled from 0–100 and adjusted for number of total Google search volumes per month in Japan and the USA) for heat-not-burn and e-cigarette products.

HTP demand presents a host of tobacco control challenges similar to e-cigarettes and new challenges specific to these products. They have been advertised as reduced-risk tobacco products in their Japanese test market.

== Marketing ==
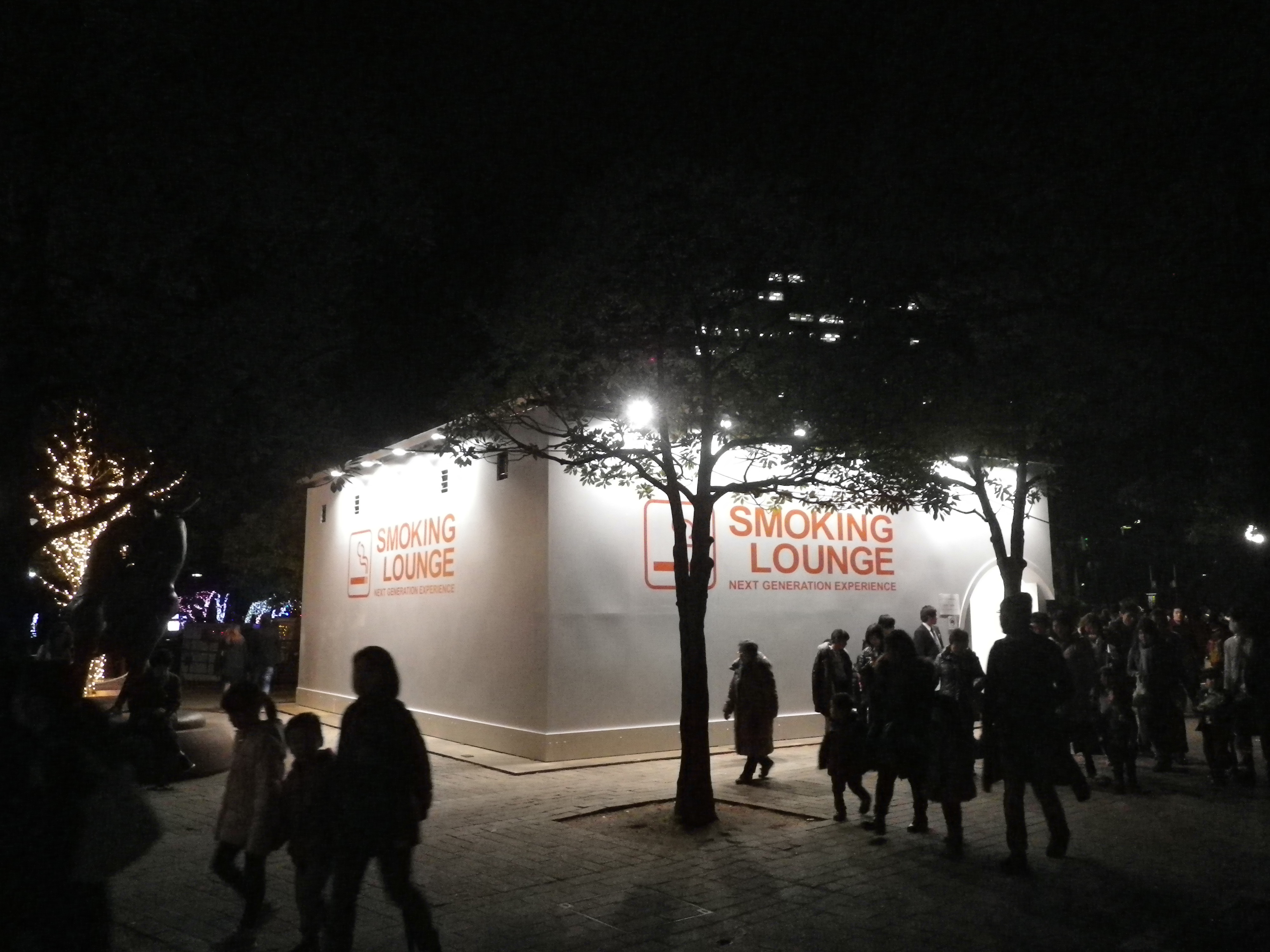
Temporary smoking room and a sales promotion of glo at the 2016 Sendai Pageant of Starlight in Kōtōdai-kōen Park, Sendai, Japan.

The term "heat-not-burn" refers to tobacco heated (at ~350 °C) by an electrically powered element or carbon instead of being fully combusted (at ~800 °C). Terms used in marketing for cigarette-like products that "heat rather than burn" refer to them as "reduced risk" and "innovative". Marketing slogans like "heat-not-burn" cannot be a substitute for science. The tobacco industry has described them as "not-burned" (heat-not-burn), though it has backtracked from this claim as of 2018. HTPs are not typically marketed as a harmless substitute to smoking, though they have been marketed as a "smoke-free" alternative to traditional cigarettes and promoted as a way to lower risk from smoking. The IQOS product has been advertised as emitting "no smoke". This advertisement claim is not a replacement for science. It is expected that the promotion associated with these products will worsen the worldwide tobacco risk.

Companies employ similar strategies previously used for traditional cigarettes, such as marketing through a variety of outlets, including celebrity endorsements. "The tobacco industry has opened heated tobacco product flagship stores, cafes and sponsored public events such as concerts and car races around the world, which is alarming," said Judith Mackay, director of the Asian Consultancy on Tobacco Control.

Internal documents and statements by PMI researchers have contradicted PMI's claims about reduced harm in regard to the IQOS product. For example, in 2018, four PMI researchers who worked for the company stated that the lowered levels of certain substances produced by the IQOS did not automatically translate into the product being safer, even though PMI stated that the IQOS is safer than traditional cigarettes, as 58 substances in IQOS aerosols were found at lower levels than in cigarette smoke.

The tobacco industry claims that smokers will switch to HTPs; however, IQOS users are more likely to smoke and/or use e-cigarettes as well. Among those who have tried or intend to try IQOS, never-smokers equal or outnumber smokers. A review of PMI's research found that smokers did not understand "switching completely" and that IQOS users are not likely to switch completely.

Since 2017, PMI has been promoting its IQOS product in Europe and Asia, where IQOS products are sold as an alternative to regular cigarettes. Outside of an IQOS retail shop in Canada, marketing included a display sign with the message, "Building a Smoke-Free Future". Philip Morris International intends to convert its customers in Japan to using heated tobacco products.

There has been significant controversy surrounding the marketing and use of these products. The tobacco companies are using a series of claims in the marketing of HTPs. In both websites and statements to the media and investors, HTPs are presented as less harmful but not risk-free. In a few instances, marketing materials claim that heated tobacco products are potentially helpful to smokers who want to quit. Some media accounts that announced product launches state that HTPs reduce the levels of harmful tobacco components by 90–95% compared to traditional cigarettes, while others emphasise the lack of odor or visible emissions as part of marketing campaigns; as of April 2018, there is no evidence to confirm the former claim. However, the public can perceive "lower exposure" claims as lower risk, even if no such claim was made explicitly. Other marketing claims highlight that these products produce no smoke (i.e., "smoke-free"). Implied in these claims, in advertisements and stores globally, is that smokers should switch from traditional cigarettes to these new, allegedly less harmful, products.

Product appeal and marketing terms used for online advertisement of heated tobacco products
Product name	Marketing terms	Product appeal
IQOS	Reduced risk product, innovative	Clean (white, bright blue), stylish, elegant
Revo	Reduced risk	Similar sized package as traditional cigarette, white or light grey or gold
PAX 2	Smaller, smarter, sleeker	Design, elegant and fun
iFuse	Reduced risk	Packed as traditional cigarette, stylish

The tobacco industry's use of the "harm reduction" framework also serves to fracture the tobacco control movement, leaving it without a unified voice to communicate with the public, the media and with policy makers on the strategies to advance tobacco control. The concept of harm reduction has traditionally been embraced in several public health fields such as clean needles for injectable drug use and has been explored by some tobacco control experts in the past, with enthusiasm for the possibility of harm reduction growing with the widespread availability of e-cigarettes in certain markets. The tobacco industry frames harm reduction as a common ground with health advocates and a possible entry point to influence legislation and regulation of tobacco products.

The tobacco companies use heated tobacco products as part of their broader political and public relations activities to position them as 'partners' to address the tobacco epidemic rather than as the vectors that are causing it. This is a similar strategy previously used by the tobacco industry to promote itself as a partner of public health in reducing the harms of tobacco, while obfuscating the scientific evidence pointing that harm reduction is achieved through tobacco control policies that decrease consumption.

== Regulation ==
HTPs are subject to different regulations than traditional cigarettes. For example, some smoking bans do not extend to include them, and in the majority of the countries in which they have been sold, they have been taxed at a lower rate than traditional cigarettes. Tobacco companies have used these products to seek exemptions and relaxations of existing tobacco control policies, and have used them in attempts to influence regulatory policy to sustain and increase their clientele in the midst of decreasing cigarette usage.

In the United States, these products fall under the jurisdiction of the FDA as amended by the Family Smoking Prevention and Tobacco Control Act of 2016. In the same year, Action on Smoking and Health stated in 2016 that "unless and until independent evidence shows that IQOS and similar products are substantially less harmful than smoking then these products should be regulated in the same way as other tobacco products." In 2017, Mitchell H. Katz, director of the Los Angeles County Health Agency, wrote: "There is concern that heat-not-burn tobacco will skirt local ordinances that prevent smoking in public areas." Tobacco control activist Stanton Glantz stated that the FDA should halt new tobacco products until tobacco companies stop selling traditional cigarettes. It is recommended that indoor-smoking bans for traditional cigarettes be extended to heated tobacco products. It is recommended that marketing of these products, and claims being made about them, should be regulated.

Advertisement for the IQOS product itself is not regulated under the European Union Tobacco Products Directive, though the directive may apply to advertising for the IQOS' tobacco stick. The UK government has been looking into creating a separate category for taxing heated tobacco products.

Due to the alleged belief in heated tobacco harm reduction in Italy, HTPs are exempted from the fiscal regimes of tobacco products. Taxes on them are reduced as much as e-cigarettes, or half of traditional cigarettes. Moreover, the enforcement of various tobacco control regulations is only minimally adopted for HTPs in Italy: health warnings are required to cover only 30% of the heated tobacco product packaging (instead of 65% for traditional cigarettes), without pictorial images; comprehensive smoke-free regulations prohibiting smoking in all public places and workplaces do not apply to HTPs; and advertising and promotions are not banned for them. Epidemiologists Xiaoqiu Liu et al. note the lax enforcement over HTPs have been exploited by the presence of "IQOS embassies" and "IQOS boutiques"—concept stores where IQOS is promoted as a status symbol and free samples are given—and believe the most recognized tobacco control policies in Italy (i.e., price/tax increase, smoking bans, advertising bans, and health warnings) have been compromised by HTPs.

HTPs are not restricted for sale in Israel by the Ministry of Health. The Justice Ministry in Israel agreed with the view of three voluntary organizations that the IQOS is a tobacco product, and that it should be regulated in the same manner as tobacco products. In Israel the IQOS is taxed at the same rate as traditional cigarettes.

Ploom, IQOS, and glo fall under the Tobacco Business Act as tobacco products in Japan because they consist of tobacco leaf. Ploom and IQOS are governed by the Tobacco Industries Act regulations as tobacco products in Japan. The Liberal Democratic Party will deliberate over increasing the tax rate for heated tobacco products in April 2018.

Electronic tobacco products using dry material are regulated as e-cigarettes in South Korea by the Ministry of Health and Welfare, which are regulated differently than traditional cigarettes for tax reasons. As a result, IQOS are taxed at a lower rate when compared to the 75% incurred on normal cigarettes. Emerging tobacco products are banned in Singapore by the Ministry of Health. China plans to pass legislation to ban the sale of these products to minors, as of 2019.

After IQOS launched a marketing campaign in New Zealand in December 2016, the country's Ministry of Health stated in 2017 that the refill sticks are not legal for sale in New Zealand under the Smoke-free Environments Act 1990. A representative for the company in New Zealand stated that IQOS products comply with the Smoke-Free Environments Act. Three meetings between Ministry of Health officials and people from the tobacco industry were held from 30 May 2017 through 2 June 2017 to "discuss regulation of new tobacco and nicotine-delivery products". In August 2017, the government stated they would initiate a review process before products are sold for heated tobacco products such as IQOS. In 2018, PMI and the Ministry of Health were in a legal dispute over the legality of selling IQOS in New Zealand, before a New Zealand court decided in March that the HEETs sticks used in the IQOS product are legal to sell in the country. Individuals can import heated tobacco products to New Zealand for personal use.

As of 2019, 49 countries have permitted the sale of IQOS.

== Bibliography ==
- "WHO Report on the Global Tobacco Epidemic, 2019" (PDF). World Health Organization. July 2019. pp. 1–209.
- McNeill, A; Brose, LS; Calder, R; Bauld, L; Robson, D (February 2018). "Evidence review of e-cigarettes and heated tobacco products 2018" (PDF). UK: Public Health England. pp. 1–243.
- "Regulatory Impact Statement: Regulation of smokeless tobacco and nicotine-delivery products" (PDF). Ministry of Health (New Zealand). 2017. pp. 1–52. Archived from the original (PDF) on 17 June 2019.
- "Further development of the partial guidelines for implementation of Articles 9 and 10 of the WHO FCTC" (PDF). World Health Organization. 12 July 2016. pp. 1–11. Archived from the original (PDF) on 8 March 2021.
- "Alternatieve tabaksproducten: harm reduction?" [Alternative tobacco products: harm reduction?] (PDF). Netherlands National Institute for Public Health and the Environment. 2016. pp. 1–66.
