= Peoria Township =

Peoria Township may refer to:

- City of Peoria Township, Peoria County, Illinois
- West Peoria Township, Peoria County, Illinois, originally Peoria Township
- Peoria Township, Franklin County, Kansas
- Peoria Township, Knox County, Nebraska
