= Test market =

Limited population for market study

A test market, in the field of business and marketing, is a geographic region or demographic group used to gauge the viability of a product or service in the mass market prior to a wide scale rollout. The criteria used to judge the acceptability of a test market region or group include:

1. a population that is demographically similar to the proposed target market; and
2. relative isolation from densely populated media markets so that advertising to the test audience can be efficient and economical.

== Practical use ==
A test market aims to duplicate reproduce all product promotion and distribution on a smaller scale. The technique replicates (typically in one area) what is planned to occur in a national launch in order to improve its chance of success. The results are monitored and extrapolated to projected national results. The area may be any one of the following:

- Television area
- Internet online test
- Test town
- Residential neighborhood
- Test site

A number of decisions are made about a test market:

- Which test market?
- What is to be tested?
- How long a test?
- What are the success criteria?

The simple go or no-go decision, together with the related reduction of risk, is normally the main justification for the expense of test markets. At the same time, however, such test markets can be used to test specific elements of a new product's marketing mix; possibly the version of the product itself, the promotional message and media spend, the distribution channels and the price. In this case, several ‘matched' test markets (usually small ones) may be used, each testing different marketing mixes.

Even in a late stage, half the products entering test markets do not justify a subsequent national launch. However, all test markets suffer from a number of disadvantages:

1. Replicability - Even the largest test market is not totally representative of the national market, and smaller ones may create significant distortions. Test market results are therefore treated with reservation, as with other types of market research.
2. Effectiveness - In many cases the major part of the investment has already been made (in development and in plant, for example) before a product is ready to be test marketed. Therefore, the reduction in risk may be minimal, and not worth the delays involved.
3. Competitor warning - Test markets can give competitors advance warning of a company's intentions and time to react. They may even be able to go national with their own product before the test is complete. They may also interfere with a test, by changing their promotional activities (usually by massively increasing them) to the extent that results are meaningless.
4. Cost - Although the main objective of test markets is to reduce the amount of investment put at risk, they can still involve significant costs.

The development and launch of almost any new product or service carries a considerable element of risk. The dominance of existing brands is considered when deciding whether the risk involved in most major launches is justifiable. In a survey of 700 consumer and industrial companies, Booz Allen Hamilton reported an average new product success rate (after launch) of 65%. Only 10% of the products surveyed were totally new, and only 20% were new product lines, but these two highest-risk categories accounted for 60% of the ‘most successful' new product list.

Since new product developments benefit from a large number of ideas being created and developed, larger companies tend to have more success in this area.

=== Risk versus time ===
Most of the stages of testing, which are the key parts of the new product process, are designed to reduce risk and ensure that the product or service will be a success. However, all of them take time, and in some markets (e.g. fashion), not much time is available.

The greatest risk is not having the "product" available at the right time, and ahead of the competitors. These markets consequently obtain less benefit from the more sophisticated, newer product processes, and typically do not make use of them at all.

Generally, there are 2 main strategies for entering a market with a new product:

1. Being the first to enter a market. This is considered highly risky. However, it also theoretically allows for a greater chance of market dominance. This is often implemented by smaller companies on smaller scales, since their investment can be smaller than that of large companies.
2. Enter the market after competitors have launched their new products. Theoretically, risks are minimized since at least one other company has already demonstrated the viability of the market. This also means there is a lesser chance of gaining market dominance.

These strategies are not equally viable in all industries. In some cases, shortening development times to be below those of competitors is the only viable method for gaining market share. For example, Japanese corporations halved development times in the very mature car industry. To quote George Stalk of the Boston Consulting Group:

The effects of this time-based advantage are devastating; quite simply, American companies are losing leadership of technology and innovation ... Unless U.S. companies reduce their product development and introduction cycles from 36-48 months to 12-18 months, Japanese manufacturers will easily out-innovate and outperform them.

=== Product replacement ===
Another form of new product launch is that of replacement of one product by a new one—usually an "improved" version. The risk levels may be greatly reduced since there is an existing user base to underwrite sales (as long as the new product doesn't alienate them, as with New Coca-Cola in the US and New Persil in the UK). This strategy can be complicated by the fact that, at least for some time, there will be two forms of the product in the pipeline. Some firms may opt for a straight cut-over; one day the old product will be coming off the production line, and the next day the new product. Most will favour parallel running for a period of time, even if only because this is forced upon them by their distribution chains. This ensures that the new really does, eventually, replace the old; and it may reveal that both can run together.

== Virtual test markets ==
The considerable amounts of time and resources necessary to conduct test markets restrict the amount of test markets which can be conducted by companies. The risk of revealing a new product design too early is another concern for companies in fast-moving and highly-competitive markets, which is independent from any cost & time considerations. To overcome these limitations a new type of test markets, virtual test markets, was devised. Virtual test markets are computer simulations of consumers, companies and the market environment. These simulations are based upon a multiagent system and use artificial intelligence methods. In a virtual test market, new products or marketing and distribution strategies can be tested without the risk and time constraints discussed above. They also allow many different products to be tested in one virtual test market, since the simulation can always be reset to the original situation before the introduction of a new product.

== Traditional test markets ==
- Albany, New York, Columbus, Ohio, and Peoria, Illinois (traditional United States test markets, see "Will it play in Peoria?")
- Haßloch (one of Germany's test markets)
- Northern Ireland (for UK product releases)
- Swindon (used as a UK-based test market for the introduction of Mondex and other product innovations)
- Carlisle (used as a UK-based test market for the introduction of US import products)
