= Eclipse (cigarette) =

American cigarette brand

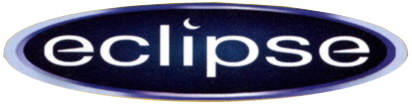
- Product type: Cigarette
- Current owner: R.J. Reynolds
- Introduced: 1994; 32 years ago

Eclipse is an American cigarette brand that was developed and marketed by R.J. Reynolds Tobacco. It heats the tobacco instead of burning it by using a carbon tip wrapped in glass fibers. In 2014 they were still in production, and one of the remaining choices allowed to be smoked in the offices of R.J. Reynolds facilities after the company began to restrict traditional smoking in their office facilities. They were retested in Wisconsin as "Revo" in 2015.

== History ==
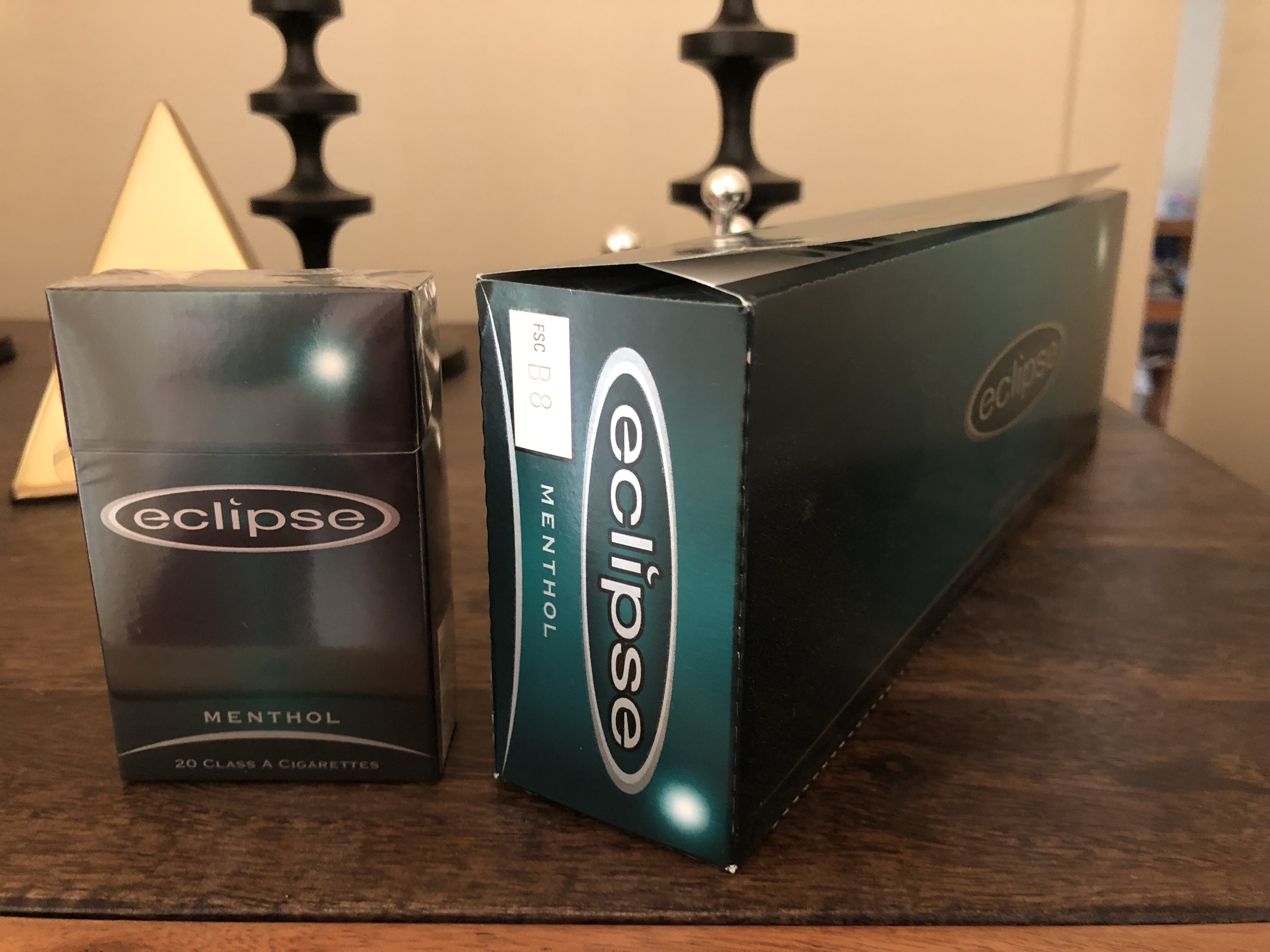
Eclipse Menthol carton and pack, photographed in 2018

According to the Associated Press the product "flopped" and in 2015 a rebranded version called "Revo" was being tested in US regional markets. Meanwhile, Eclipse remained in "limited distribution", perhaps mainly on sale in the staff cafe at Reynolds' headquarters.

Revo is essentially the same as Eclipse, but with a different appearance. It primarily heated tobacco instead of burning it. The price was close to a premium pack of traditional cigarettes. Eclipse continues to be available in limited supply, as of 2014.

In July 2015 the CEO of Reynolds said they "planned to discontinue its heat-not-burn cigarette Revo, which it began testing in Wisconsin in February. She said consumer adoption rates failed to meet expectations."

== Safety ==
The American Cancer Society argues that the cigarettes are not as safe as the marketing campaign suggests, and that they should be removed from the marketplace: although they produce less tar and produce less second-hand smoke, this leads to a false sense of security, since the cigarette still contains high amounts of carcinogens. Other concerns are that they produce more carbon monoxide than regular cigarettes. R. J. Reynolds has countered by claiming that the company is not trying to market a "safe" cigarette, only a better alternative.

== See also ==
- Premier - Predecessor in concept to Eclipse
