= Twopeny =

Twopeny is a surname. Notable people with the surname include:

- Edward Twopeny (1854–1932), Australian politician
- J. R. N. Twopeny, Australian architect, in practice with F. Kenneth Milne 1961–1973
- Nowell Twopeny (1819–1869), English priest
- Richard Twopeny (1857–1915), Australian rules footballer
