= Percy Barrington, 8th Viscount Barrington =

British peer (1825–1901)

The Right Honourable The Viscount Barrington
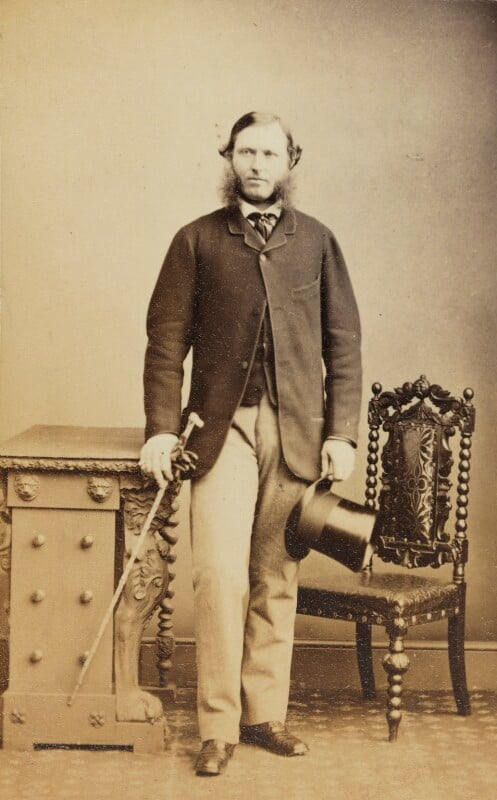
- Barrington in the 1860s

High Sheriff of Buckinghamshire
- In office 1864
- Preceded by: Philips Cosby Lovett
- Succeeded by: Nathaniel Lambert

Personal details
- Born: 22 April 1825 London, England
- Died: 29 April 1901 (aged 76) Buckinghamshire, England
- Spouse: Louisa Higgins (m. 1845; died 1884)
- Relations: Thomas Liddell, 1st Baron Ravensworth (grandfather)
- Children: 3
- Parent(s): William Barrington, 6th Viscount Barrington; Hon. Jane Elizabeth Liddell
- Education: Eton College

Percy Barrington, 8th Viscount Barrington (22 April 1825 – 29 April 1901), was a British soldier and landowner.

== Early life ==
Barrington was born in London on 22 April 1825. He was the second son of William Barrington, 6th Viscount Barrington, and his wife the Hon. Jane Elizabeth Liddell, daughter of Thomas Liddell, 1st Baron Ravensworth. His elder brother was George Barrington, 7th Viscount Barrington, MP. His younger brothers were diplomat Sir William Barrington and civil servant Sir Eric Barrington, and among his sisters were Hon. Caroline Barrington (wife of James Agar, 3rd Earl of Normanton) and Hon. Augusta Barrington (wife of the Rt. Hon. and Most Rev. William Dalrymple Maclagan, Archbishop of York).

Like his father and elder brother, Barrington was educated at Eton College.

== Career ==
Barrington served as a Second lieutenant in the Rifle Brigade from 1841, transferring to the Scots Fusilier Guards in 1844 before retiring at the end of 1845. The following year he was commissioned as a Captain in the disembodied Oxfordshire Militia.

In 1864, he succeeded Philips Cosby Lovett, of Liscombe House, as High Sheriff of Buckinghamshire, serving for a year until Nathaniel Grace Lambert of Denham Court became the next Sheriff.

After his brother's death at Grimsthorpe Castle, in November 1886, Percy succeeded in his titles (and in the barony of Shute which was created in the Peerage of the United Kingdom in 1880 according to the special remainder for Percy's benefit).

== Personal life ==
On 3 July 1845, Barrington was married to Louisa Higgins, the only daughter and heiress of Tully Higgins. Together, they had three children:

- William Bulkeley Barrington, 9th Viscount Barrington (1848–1933), who married Mary Isabella Bogue in 1870.
- Hon. Alice Louisa Barrington (d. 1928), who married cricketer George Augustus Campbell, the second son of Col. George Herbert Campbell, in 1868.
- Hon. Edith Barrington (d. 1919), who married Capt. Abraham John Robarts (1838–1926) of Tile House, the High Sheriff of Buckinghamshire, in 1869. Robarts was the eldest son of banker Abraham Robarts and Elizabeth Sarah Smyth (a daughter of John Henry Smyth of Heath Hall and Lady Elizabeth Anne FitzRoy, a daughter of George FitzRoy, 4th Duke of Grafton).

His wife died on 17 May 1884 before he succeeded to his titles. Lord Barrington died on 29 April 1901 at Westbury Manor. He was buried on 3 May 1901 at St. Peter's Churchyard in Brackley, Northamptonshire, England.

=== Descendants ===
Through his daughter Edith, he was a grandfather of Gerald Robarts, a British Army officer, banker, and leading squash rackets player. He was a director of Coutts & Co. until 1931.

Through his daughter Alice, he was a grandfather of Evelyn Mary Campbell, who married Hubert Eaton (son of the Charles Ormston Eaton), and Sir Archibald Henry Campbell, who married Hon. Beryl Dawnay (daughter of Hugh Dawnay, 8th Viscount Downe and granddaughter of Charles Molyneux, 3rd Earl of Sefton).

Peerage of Ireland
Preceded by George Barrington	Viscount Barrington; 1886–1901	Succeeded by Walter Barrington
Peerage of the United Kingdom
Preceded by George Barrington	Baron Shute; 1886–1901	Succeeded by Walter Barrington
