= Church of St Mary and St Augustine, Stamford =

Church in Stamford, Lincolnshire, England

Coordinates: 52.6537°N 0.4775°W

- The Parish Church of St Mary and St Augustine
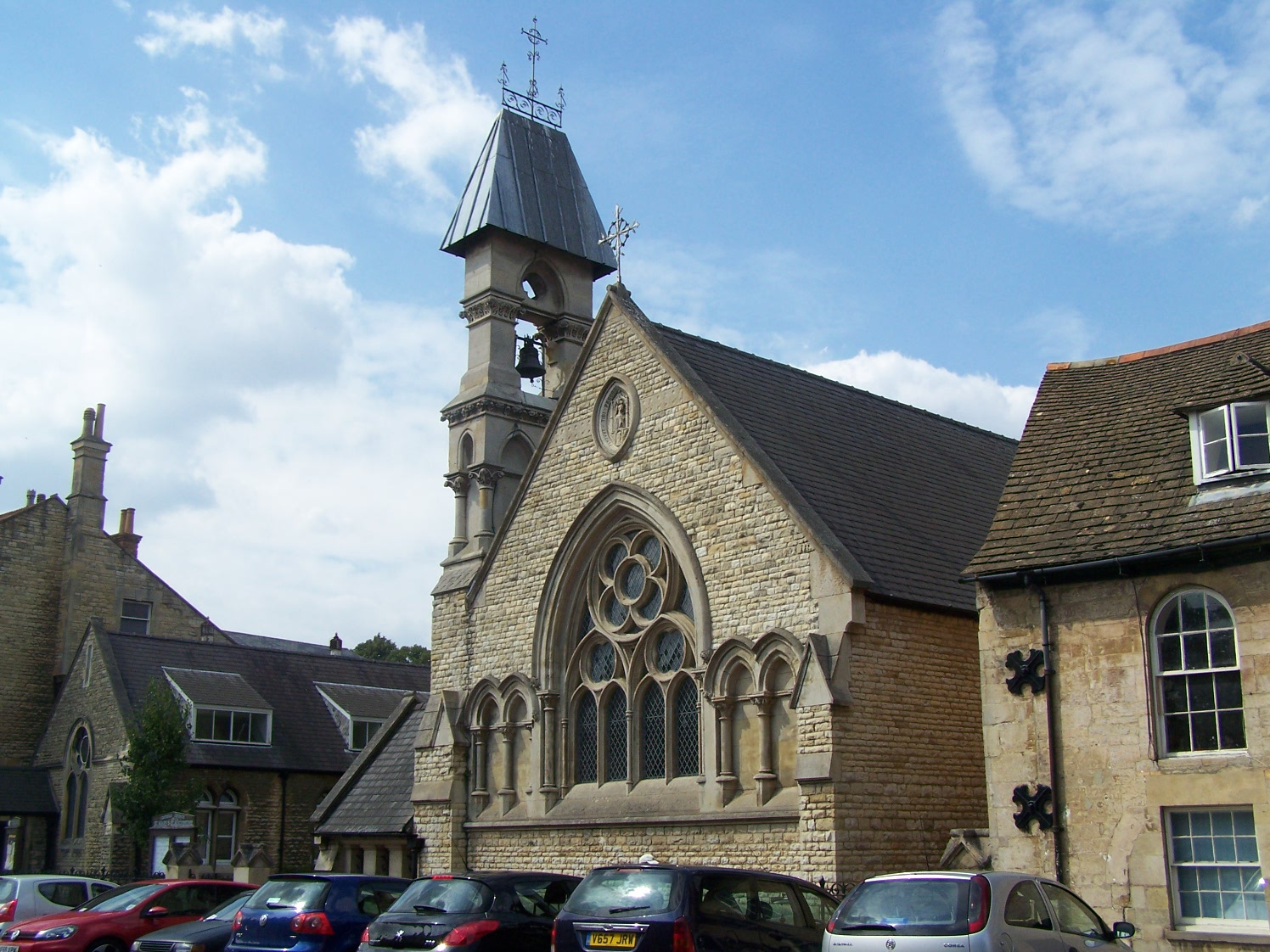
- St Mary and St Augustine Church, Broad Street, Stamford
- Church of St Mary and St Augustine, Stamford
- OS grid reference: TF 03083 07309
- Country: England
- Denomination: Catholic
- Website: https://catholic-oakham-stamford.org.uk

Architecture
- Architect: George Goldie
- Years built: 1862-1864

Administration
- Province: Westminster
- Diocese: Nottingham

Clergy
- Priest: Canon Peter Vellacott

The Parish Church of St Mary and St Augustine in Stamford, Lincolnshire, England, is home to a congregation of the Roman Catholic Diocese of Nottingham. St Augustine's (as it is generally known) was designed in a "robust High Victorian Early English" style by George Goldie and built in 1862-64.

== Foundation and exterior ==
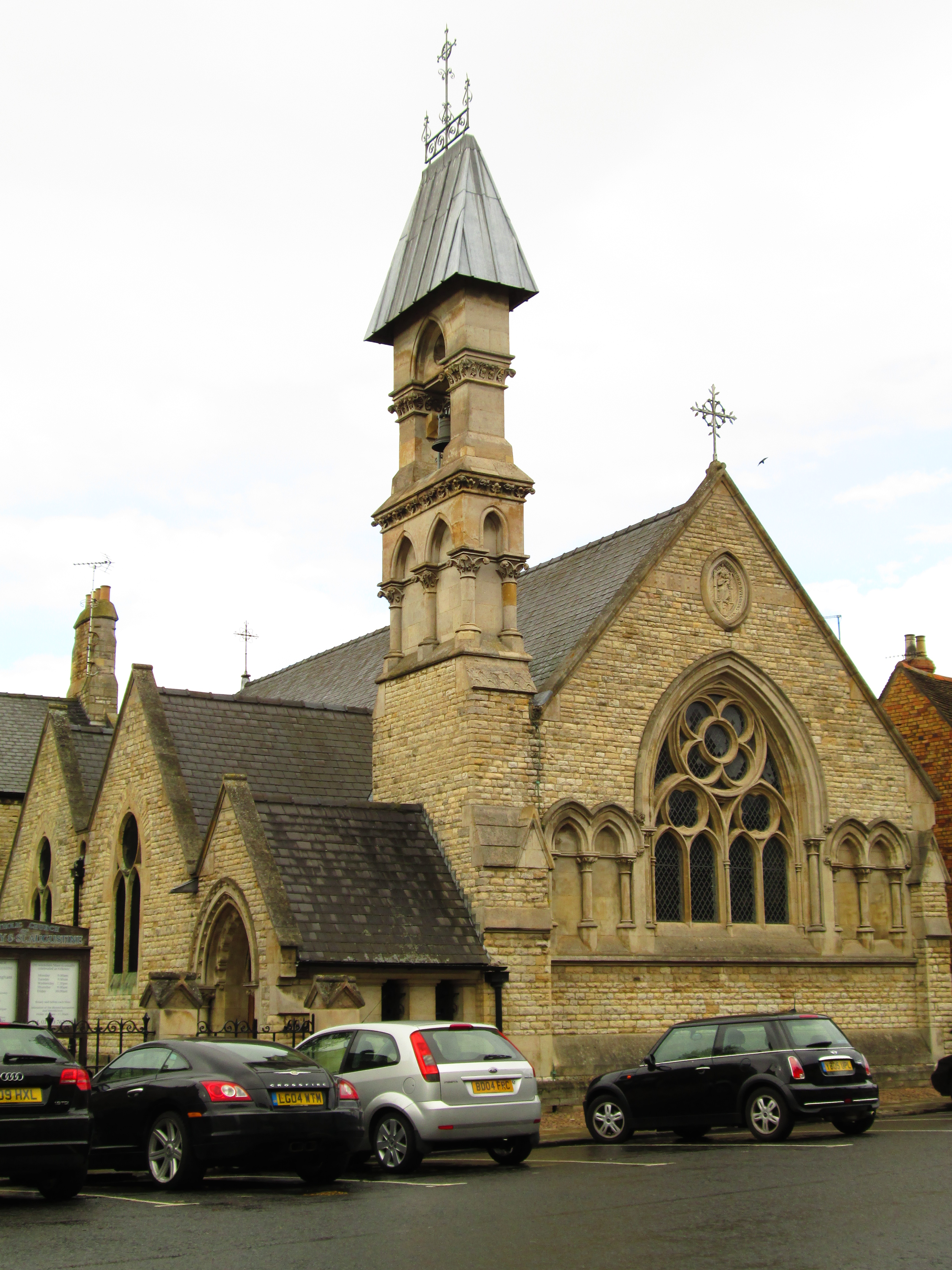

The church (originally Our Lady & St Augustine, following continental Catholic practice and described as such by Nikolaus Pevsner) was built on the north side of Stamford's Broad Street on the site of the Dolphin public house. It replaced an earlier place of worship, a chapel in the Gothic style situated in All Saints Street, which functioned between 1834 and 1864 and which in the 1830s was one of only six Catholic chapels in Lincolnshire. Prior to this, during the anti-Catholic penal laws, Mass had been celebrated secretly in some of Stamford's numerous cellars, in particular, that of no. 24, High Street St Martin's. The first resident parish priest of this post-Reformation parish, between 1833 and 1838, was William Wareing, who in 1850 became the first Bishop of Northampton on the Restoration of the Catholic Hierarchy.

The dedication to St Augustine of Canterbury, perhaps reflected the pro-English predilections of the patrons of the new building – in particular Charles Ormston Eaton, a local banker and resident of Tolethorpe Hall and Charles Noel, 2nd Earl of Gainsborough (both part of the wave of 19th-century converts to Catholicism that followed the Oxford Movement; most 19th-century Catholic communities, in contrast, had a distinctly Irish flavour).

The church comprises a nave, a two-bay 'north' aisle with round, Romanesque arches, a canted sanctuary, small south chapel with apse and north porch. It is accompanied by a presbytery (priest's house) and parish school (added in 1870 and also by Goldie) built around a small garden facing Broad Street. The Stamford Mercury anticipated the church would be "the prettiest modern Gothic erection in the town" and, subsequently, "…taking the size of the town into consideration, probably equal to any erected in England in modern times". It enthused that "the altar and reredos…are beautiful specimens of art-work…of Caen stone. The former is enriched with gold monograms of Our Lady & St Austin to whom the church is dedicated, encircled by the pretty ball-flower ornament, the panels being divided by shafts of serpentine marble supporting exquisitely wrought foliated capitals… The reredos terminates in a symbolically foliated finial extending to the lofty open roof. The panels, which are as rich as the finest sculpture of angels (in bas relief) can render them, are also divided by black marble shafts, the rich tabernacle, for the reception of the shrine projecting from the centre. The church is lighted with four corona or stars of 15 gas jets each, the effect of which upon the altar and reredos and the numerous accessories they contain is gorgeous and is consequently very imposing…" Pevsner reviewed the building without much enthusiasm however – albeit at a time when Victoriana was not highly thought of. He described the church's little campanile as "an unbelievable bell-turret, asymmetically placed and most crudely detailed" although it does provides a focus to the vista facing east from the middle of Broad Street and "is the external focus of the building".

On the church's gable end is carved a representation of the Medieval seal of the Borough of Stamford, displaying a burgess kneeling before an image of the Virgin Mary and Child Jesus, surrounded by the Latin motto: Stanford Burgenses Virgo Fundant Tibi Preces that is: "To Thee, O Virgin, the Burgesses of Stamford Pour Out Prayers." This seal had been unused in Stamford since the English Reformation although an example can be found in the collection of the British Museum.

The church's formal opening on 6 June 1865 was reported at length in the Mercury. Four bishops participated in the ceremony – Roskell of Nottingham, Amherst of Northampton, the retired William Wareing and Grant of Southwark, as well as the mitred abbot of Mount St Bernard Abbey in Leicestershire, attended by thirty further clergy. The bishops were "invested in rich copes and mitres… [and] formed a very imposing spectacle" and High Mass was "celebrated with considerable splendour". After the ceremony Charles Ormston Eaton presided over a celebratory lunch at the George Hotel where besides the clergy and the architect, Goldie, other guests included the Marchioness of Lothian, a Lady Fitzgerald and various local dignitaries, before the party returned to church at 3pm for Benediction and a sermon by an eminent Jesuit preacher from London.

The final cost of church and presbytery, as evidenced by Goldie's invoice, amounted to £2,296, 0s, 6d.
