= All Saints' Church, Little Casterton =

Church in Little Casterton, Rutland

Coordinates: 52°40′38″N 0°29′44″W

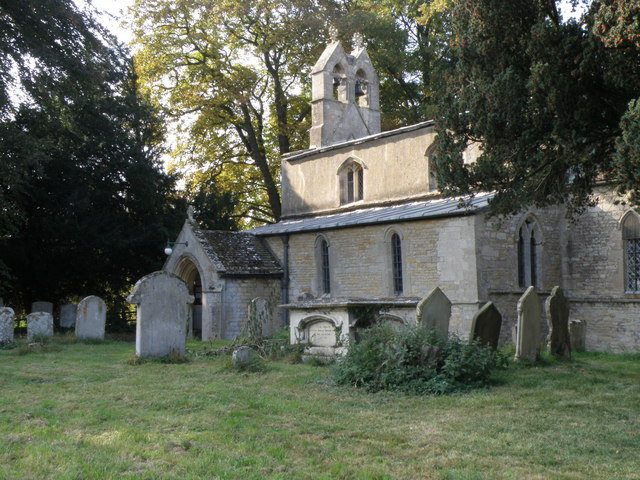
- Denomination: Church of England

History
- Dedication: All Saints

Administration
- Diocese: Peterborough
- Parish: Little Casterton, Rutland

Clergy
- Vicar(s): Don McGarrigle

All Saints' Church is a church in Little Casterton, Rutland. The Church of England parish church is a Grade II* listed building.

== History ==
The church is one of the smallest in Rutland and has no tower. There is just a bell-cote at the west end.

The north aisle was added in the late 12th century and the south aisle in the 13th century. Also built in the 13th century is the bell-cote and chancel. A clerestory was added in the 15th century. The chancel was extended and the north aisle was rebuilt during the 1810-1811 restoration. A new porch was built in 1837. A tympanum, showing three circles either side of the Tree of Life, is in the north aisle. The east and west windows have stained glass by Christopher Whall; the east window commemorates Hubert Eaton.

There are two bells in the church. One was made by Tobias Norris, the other is unknown.

== Clergy ==
- William Hawkins (priest)
- Nowell Twopeny
- Francis Byng, 5th Earl of Strafford
