= Casterton =

Casterton may refer to one of the following locations:

== Australia ==
- Casterton, Victoria

== United Kingdom ==
- Casterton, Cumbria
- Great Casterton, Rutland
- Little Casterton, Rutland
