= Alice in Wonderland and Through the Looking-Glass =

2001 play by Adrian Mitchell

- Original title: Alice in Wonderland and Through the Looking-Glass: a new Dramatisation
- Original language: English
- Written by: Lewis Carroll; Adrian Mitchell
- Based on: Lewis Carroll (novel) Lewis Carroll (novel)
- Subject: Dreams, storytelling, childhood
- Genre: Fantasy, play with songs
- Setting: The banks of the river Thames, Oxford 1862 (Prologue), Wonderland (a dream realm), Fictional Alice's drawing room, Looking-Glass World (a dream realm), Fictional Alice's drawing room, The banks of the river Thames, Oxford 1862 (Epilogue)

Premiere
- Date: 2001
- Place: Barbican Centre; London, England
- Original run: 2001 - 2002 (Royal Shakespeare Company) 2010 - 2011 (Chichester Festival Theatre) 2014 (Stamford Shakespeare Company) 2022 (Jersey Arts Centre)
- Official website

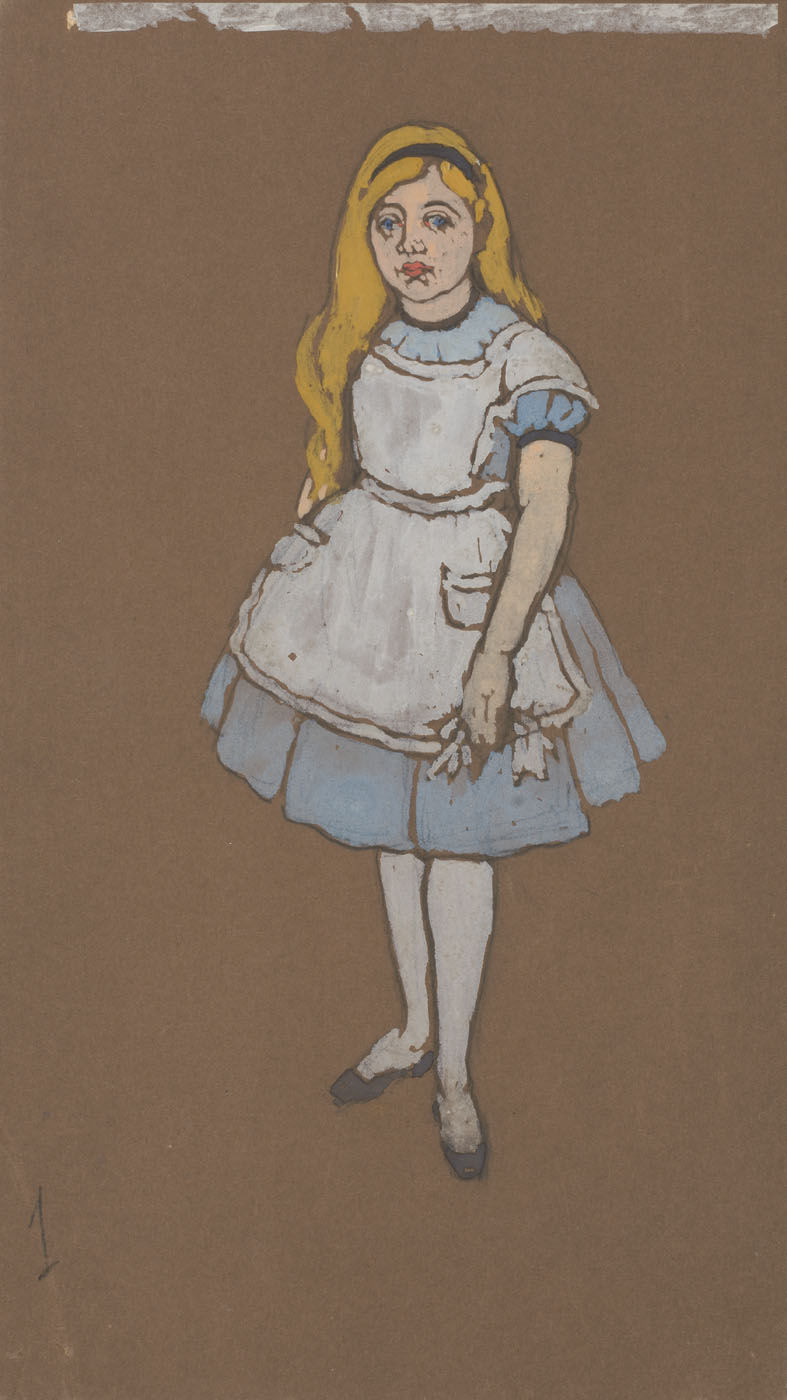
William Penhallow Henderson, a stage costume design for the fictional Alice (circa 1915)

Alice in Wonderland and Through the Looking-Glass (often styled as Alice in Wonderland & Through the Looking-Glass) is a 2001 stage adaptation of Lewis Carroll's 1865 novel Alice's Adventures in Wonderland, and the 1871 novel Through the Looking-Glass. It was written by Adrian Mitchell and first produced at the Royal Shakespeare Company in the UK.

Mitchell's play holds the distinction for being the most comprehensive stage adaptation of Carroll's two Alice books yet made, keeping the endings of both novels intact and only minor changes made for theatrical staging reasons. It has a run time of one hour 40 minutes to two hours. The play in English is available to licence worldwide, for theatre performances through Concord Theatricals (in a variation using a more limited set, and smaller 16 person cast, as opposed to the original production's 20) Like the novels it adapts, Mitchell's play is an example of surreal humour and an exploration of dreams in childhood done in a whimsical way.

The original 2001 RSC production was filmed in 2002, directed by Rachel Kavanaugh, and featured Katherine Heath as Alice. The play has since been presented at Chichester Festival Theatre in 2010, with set designs by Simon Higlett. In 2014, it was presented by Stamford Shakespeare Company, for the first time in an outdoor theatre setting, at Tolethope Hall in Rutland, UK. In 2022, it was produced at Jersey Arts Centre, Jersey, in association with the french company ARTcomedia, with a scaled down cast of 13.

Mitchell's play differs from most stage adaptations of Alice in adapting both novels and not having the stories as one single combined dream, but as two separate dreams split over two acts. This unusually matches this play to the exact plot structure of the original Carroll novels. The drawing room scene at the end of act 1 in the play, and the interval between act 1 and act 2, work as a narrative reset, to then present the entire second novel in act 2. Cast sizes in productions have ranged from 13 actors, to 20. Although originally written for the large scale RSC, Mitchell's play is also intended to be equally performed by smaller casts, using only limited props. The play is written with heavy cast doubling in mind.

Alice is an example of the long line of literary adaptations comissioned by the RSC (which began with Dickens's Nicholas Nickleby as adapted by David Edgar in 1980) and an early example of children's book adaptations at RSC for the Christmas holidays. Due to its comission for Christmas, subsequent productions by other companies have also performed the play during winter seasons although not always.

== Inception of Adrian Mitchell's play ==
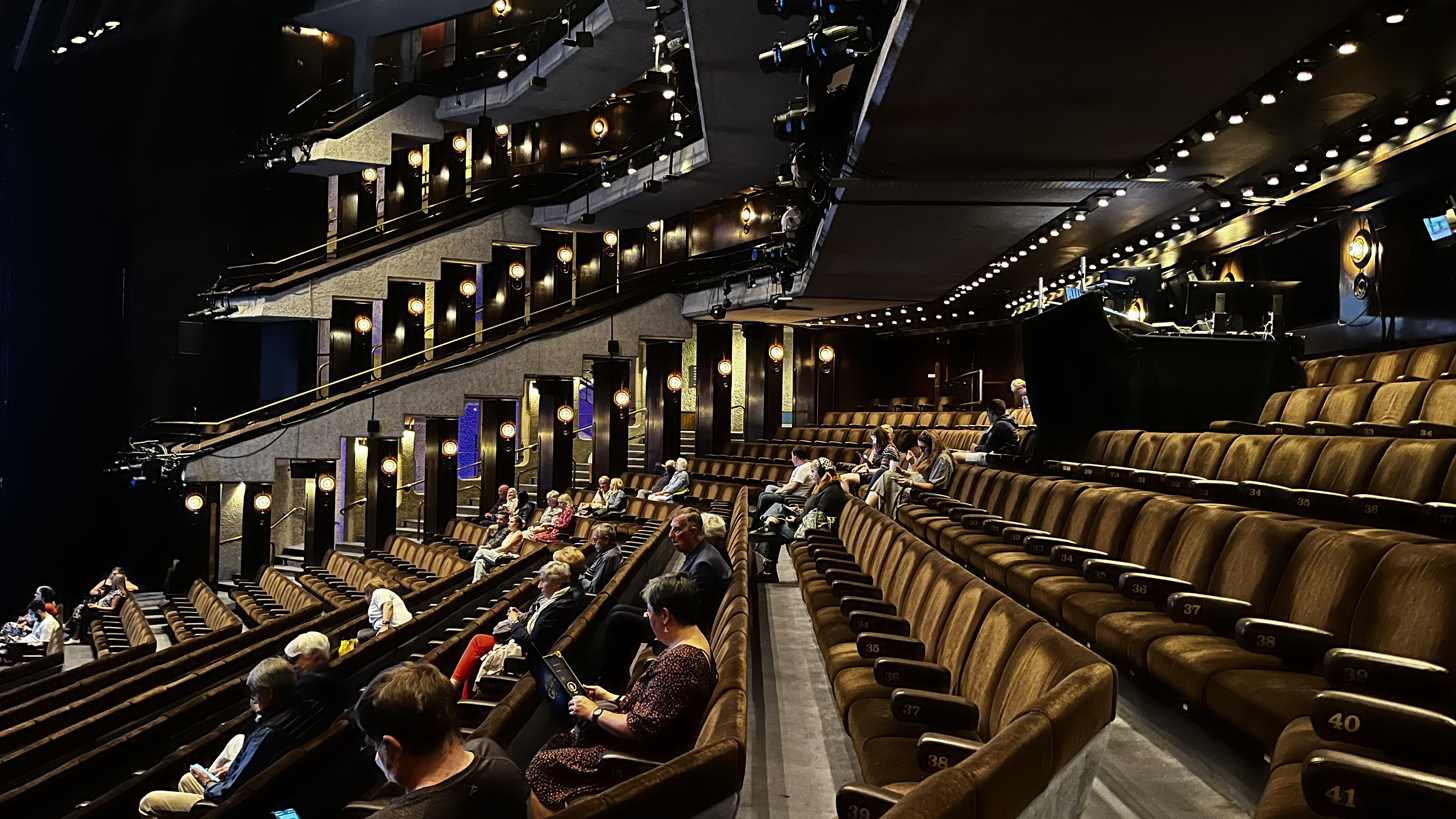
The auditorium of the Barbican Centre London, UK, where Mitchell's play was first produced in 2001 by the RSC. It later transferred to the Royal Shakespeare Theatre in Stratford Upon-Avon.

Mitchell's stage adaptation originated as a commission from the Royal Shakespeare Company. This followed a successful adaptation of The Lion, the Witch and the Wardrobe by C.S Lewis in 1998 also for the same company. The play was made during a time of economic and internal stress for the RSC, which may or may not have affected the perception of the first production.

Mitchell's stage adaptation of the Alice novels by Lewis Carroll has somewhat limited stage directions in the text, aside from explaining scenery and transitions, allowing for it to be used in a manner of theatrical styles. Mitchell's published script also includes Charles Dodgson's own notes (originally published for Clarke's stage adaptation) on his characters, to help guide actors in performance. Mitchell also decided in adapting to keep the self parody characters that Charles Dodgson wrote into his novels: Lorina Liddell doubles as the Lory, Edith Liddell as the Eaglet, Robinson Duckworth as the Duck, and Charles Dodgson himself as both the Dodo and the White Knight.

Alice in the play can be split to 2 actors, so that Alice Liddell appears only in the Oxford 1862 prologue and epilogue, and the fictional 7 year old eccentric Alice is the protagonist for the entire act 1 and act 2. As Karoline Leach notes, "Dodgson never confused Alice {Liddell} with Alice the way we do. Even as he wrote the first draft of the Wonderland story, his "little heroine" was already carefully differentiated from the real child whose name she shared."

In his essay, "Millions of Alices", Mitchell revealed that he equally adapted Lewis Carroll's 2 Alice novels for his grandchildren: "Charles Dodgson/Lewis Carroll said he wrote Alice, to "please a child I loved (I don't remember any other motive)." That is the best reason in the world, and to please seven children I love is why I wrote this play." The RSC 2001 programme further gives details on Charles Dodgson/Lewis Carroll, Victorian era Oxford, and the play's characters, these notes all aimed at a young audience. Mitchell further elaborated on his play's vision: "There are a lot of bad tempered people. The Hatter is hectoring and the Caterpillar sneers. [Alice is] a child among adults. Alice is put-upon but she deals with it. She dances into each encounter, is friendly with the White Queen and with the White Knight, who is Carroll himself." Mitchell's play keeps the intellectual, whimsical, strange, fantastical and occasionally slightly dark tone of Carroll's original novels. As noted in reviews for Mitchell's C.S Lewis ...Wardrobe adaptation in 1998, his work aimed at young people refused to "talk down" to students, teenagers and child audiences, instead appealing to a broad audience of as many age brackets as possible. Accordingly, Mitchell's Alice play has since been produced by both professional companies with adult actors as well as student and youth theatre companies. All productions are aimed at an all ages audience.

== Inception of Carroll's original novels ==
In his adaptation of the books, Mitchell opens and closes his play with a somewhat fictionalized version of the biographically famous "Golden Afternoon" on the 4th of July 1862. This was the first day when Charles Dodgson (Lewis Carroll) told the stories that would become the Alice novels to his friend Canon Robinson Duckworth and the Liddell children, Alice, Lorina, and Edith. This storytelling took place on a boating trip to Godstow from Oxford. The three sisters wished to hear nonsense stories as entertainment. Edward Wakeling notes that going boating was a typical Victorian activity:

In the Victorian age, life and attitudes were very different. If a man took a group of young children, all unrelated to him, on a boat-trip that lasted all afternoon, no-one would mind in the slightest. If a man took an unaccompanied young lady aged 17 to 25 on a similar boat-trip, he would cause untold damage to that lady's reputation and marriage prospects. Today, the reverse is true.

In Mitchell's play, the prologue and epilogue is framed with Dodgson telling the boat trip party both the Alice books in one day. In reality, Alice's adventures in Wonderland was told across a few boating trips in summer 1862:

"Occasionally [Dodgson] would take [the Liddells] out on boat trips, either with his brother, with a friend, or with visiting sisters. On these sociable river trips, the grown ups would allow the children to row, and they would all sing songs, or ask riddles."

Karoline Leach notes that occasionally Dodgson got bored with having to tell this story over the summer:

"Indications are the girls loved the tale and were always begging for new instalments, but that Dodgson was less enthusiastic (on one occasion he calls it the ‘interminable’ Alice's Adventures, and is peeved because he wants to sing them a new song he just made up instead)" Leach notes that Alice Liddell had to "pester" Dodgson on multiple occasions to make sure the story got written down.

On 6 August 1862, Dodgson finished the Wonderland story with a trial as a joke reference. This was inspired by the Liddell sisters' earlier attempts that day to play a popular logic game called "Ural Mountains", where two team captains had to argue an absurd crime. Dodgson wrote the stories he told down, starting on the 13th of November 1862. In February 1863, Dodgson gave an early version of the manuscript to friend and children's author George Macdonald, who read it to his family. Mrs Macdonald told Dodgson he could publish it as a novel. In November 1863, Dodgson met with publisher Alexander Macmillan. Much later, after the illustrations were complete, Dodgson finally presented the manuscript of Alice's adventures Underground (later called Alice's adventures in Wonderland) to Alice Liddell, in November 1864. The sequel novel to Wonderland, Through the Looking-Glass, published in 1871, was made from later stories, that Charles Dodgson told the Liddells when the sisters were learning how to play chess. The Looking-Glass stories were written down at a time of anguish for Charles Dodgson, after his father had died.

== Play synopsis ==
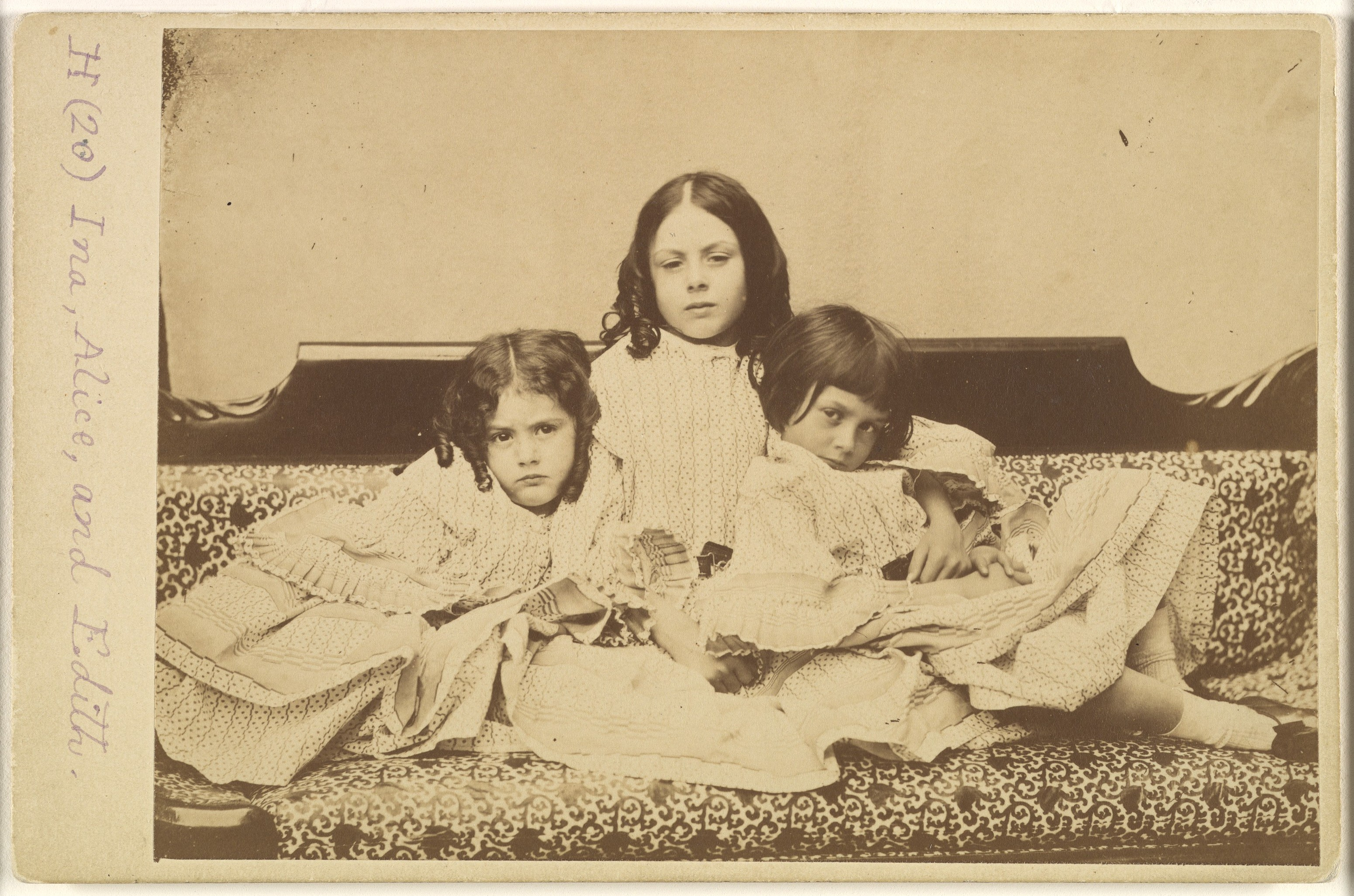
The 3 Liddell sisters, Edith (left) Lorina (middle) and Alice (right) as photographed by Charles Dodgson/Lewis Carroll in 1858.

=== Prologue: Oxford, 1862 ===
In Oxford, on the 4th of July 1862, Alice Liddell (aged 10) her sisters Lorina (aged 13) and Edith (aged 6) and Canon Robinson Duckworth, drift down the river Thames. ("Golden Afternoon") The boating crew sit for a river picnic, to listen to the stories told by their friend, writer Charles Dodgson (AKA Lewis Carroll) until the evening. The sisters specifically request that Dodgson tells them stories with lots of nonsense in them. Alice Liddell in particular listens closely. She imagines the fictional "Alice" and all her adventures and dreams as Dodgson tells them to the party.

=== Act 1: Alice in Wonderland ===
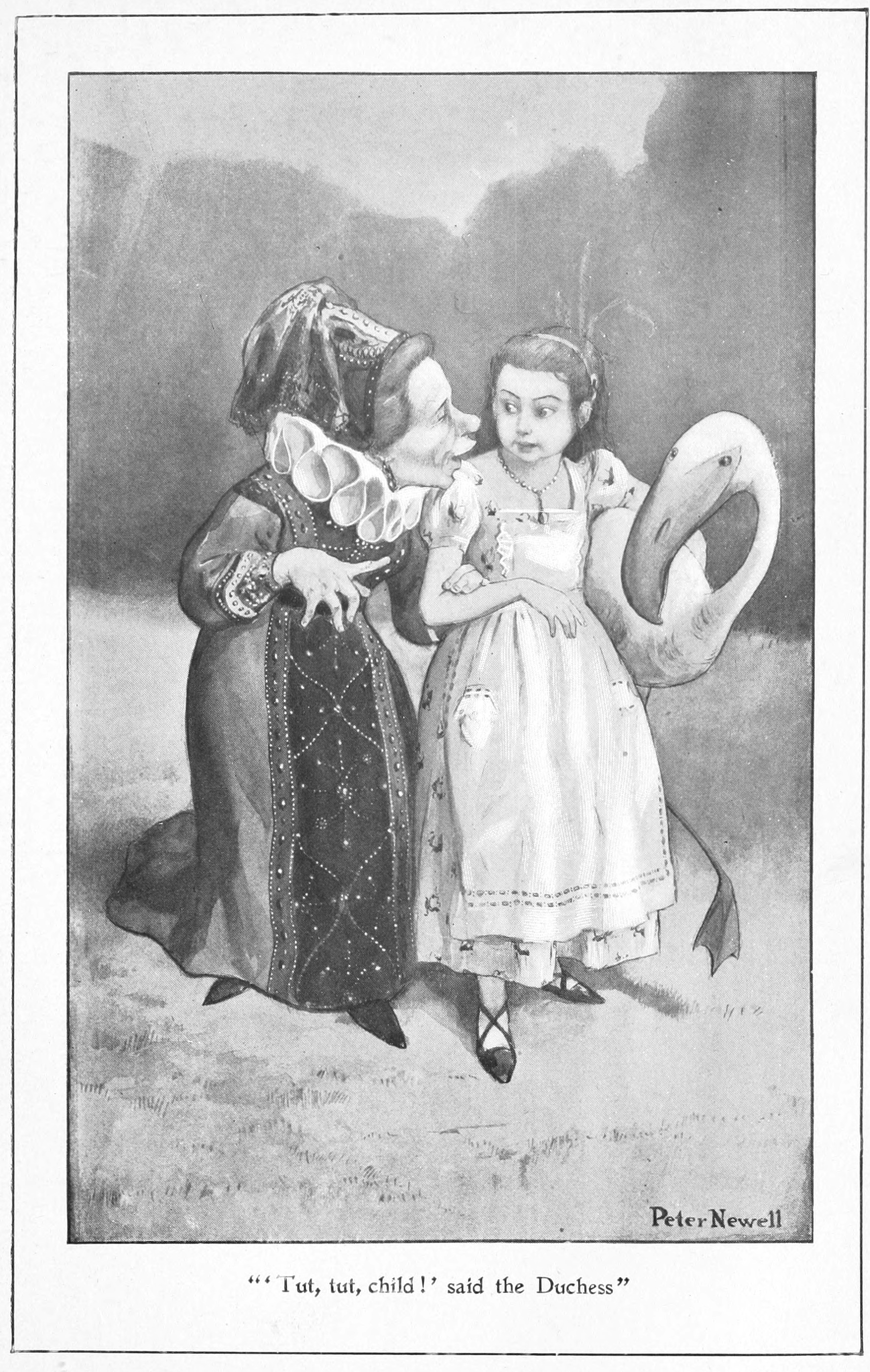
Alice, playing croquet in Wonderland, encounters the Duchess again. 1901 illustration by Peter Newell for Alice's adventures in Wonderland (1865) by Lewis Carroll.

The imaginary Alice, aged 7 and a half, bright, and eccentric, is bored with sitting on a riverbank during a sleepy, hot day. She follows an unusually dressed, late rabbit down a rabbit hole into Wonderland. She falls very slowly through a deep well packed with furniture and cupboards, and has time to think about lessons and work out where she will land. ("Down, Down, Down"). Landing in a hall of endless doors, Alice tries adjusting her size with food and a drink, to fit a tiny door leading to a beautiful garden. As she fails, she cries an entire sea of tears. She attempts singing an old song to comfort herself, but instead recites a parody of it. ("How doth the little Crocodile") Shrinking her size again after being given a fan by the White Rabbit, Alice swims with an irritated Mouse in the pool of tears, who she annoys with talk about her beloved cat Dinah. At the shore, Alice and the Mouse run a caucus race with absurd animals and birds (all played by the same actors as the prologue boating party sisters and friends). The mouse tells Alice why it hates cats and dogs, it had a legal battle with one. ("Fury said to a Mouse") Alice accidentally insults it, and everyone leaves her behind. Now a very small size, Alice seeks advice from a precise Caterpillar. She again recites a poem incorrectly ("You are old father William") before the Caterpillar gives her the secret of size changing via a mushroom. The correct size, Alice finds in the forest a mysterious house. At the entrance she witnesses a funny ritual of letter swapping between two footmen, one a frog, and another a fish. When the fish leaves, Alice tries the house door, but gets pulled into a nonsense argument about the ethics of knocking on doors with the frog footman. Alice eventually marches into the house. She defends a baby from an alarming Duchess and her Cook in the house's kitchen, whilst being fascinated by a grinning cat, called a Cheshire Cat, who sits on the rug. ("Wow! Wow! Wow!") Alice takes the Duchess's baby away from the house, alarmed for its safety. Outside, it turns into a piglet and trots away, to her great surprise. Alice turns around and sees the Cheshire Cat sitting in a tree. The Cat reveals that everyone in Wonderland is bizarre and that Alice must be mad too, or else she wouldn't have stumbled into the world. The cat directs her to the March Hare's house and leaves Alice in wonder at its famous vanishing trick, leaving its grin only to be seen in the trees. Alice follows the cat's advice and sits down to take tea with the strange Hatter, March Hare, and Dormouse. The hatter explains he argued with time, which condemned him to be stuck at tea time forever. ("Twinkle, Twinkle, little bat..") The riddles, rhymes and nonsense the party tell Alice infuriates her as much as it amuses her. When the Hatter insults her, Alice decides she must leave the party. Finding a way back into the hall of doors, Alice uses the Caterpillar's mushroom to change size. She can finally enter the garden through the small door. Alice is dismayed the garden is the realm of the bad tempered Queen of Hearts, the Queen of Wonderland itself, who loves beheading her subjects. After chatting with some card gardeners who have accidentally painted white roses red, Alice meets the Queen of Hearts herself, and is less than impressed. The Queen demands that everyone play croquet. Alice, along with the Queen's subjects, play croquet with hedgehogs and flamingos, that Alice finds an impossible game. Everyone has a death sentence given by the Queen, which the King removes from behind her back when she is preoccupied with other things. Alice talks with the Duchess about morals and sayings, before the Queen spoils the fun through ordering the Duchess to leave or be executed. Alice meets again with the Cheshire cat, who offends the King, but avoids execution by the Queen via vanishing. Alice goes to Wonderland's seashore, and meets with a sad Mock Turtle and his friend the Gryphon, who tell her about their schooldays, and teach her the Lobster Quadrille dance. ("The Lobster Quadrille") Alice's adventures in Wonderland end at a surreal trial for the Knave of Hearts ("The Queen of Hearts, she made some tarts...") where the Hatter's evidence is puns and rhymes, and the Duchess's Cook's is making everyone sneeze with pepper. The white Rabbit as herald sings a new piece of evidence that in fact confuses things even further. ("They told me you had been to Her") Growing suddenly after eating a tart from the evidence, Alice comes to blows with the Queen of Hearts. A pack of cards attack her and she falls, awaking in an armchair, in her drawing room at home. Her sisters look across the room at Alice in some surprise. Alice talks to the sisters (who also happen to be called Lorina and Edith, a reference to Alice Liddell's sisters) about her dream of Wonderland. Snow begins to come down outside, to the children's delight. They watch the snow out of the window as act 1 ends.

=== Act 2 : Through the Looking-Glass ===
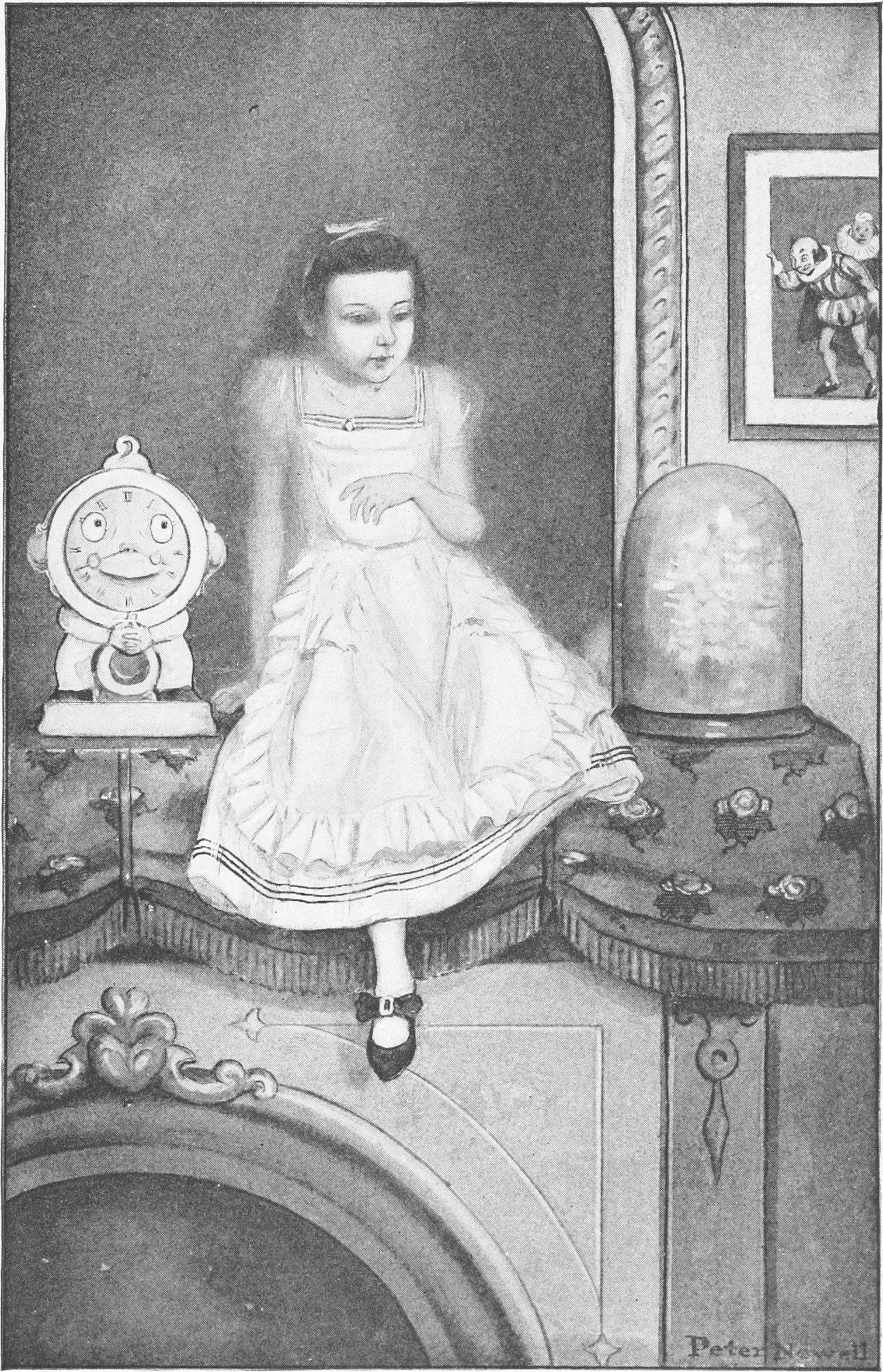
Alice climbs through the looking Glass, 1902 illustration by Peter Newell for Through the Looking-Glass and what Alice found there (1872) by Lewis Carroll.

Act 2 begins during undisclosed amount of days and months later, in the drawing-room of the fictional Alice during a snowy winter's evening. The fictional Alice unwittingly annoys her sisters by attempting to play a chess game with them. Lorina, cold and alienated, goes to bed. Edith, too young to understand the game, leaves as she fears she will lose. Alice is left with her three cats, Kitty, Snowdrop, and old cat Dinah. The night grows later. Alice drifts into a daydream before being drawn to the mirror above the fireplace, which she magically traverses. ("Moonlight on the Mirror") On the other side, she reads a nonsense poem, Jabberwocky, by holding a book up to the glass so the words can be read. ("The Jabberwocky") The poem is a nonsense epic about a monster's death. Outside the mirror house is the Looking-Glass World, another world which turns out to be just as strange as Wonderland was. After chatting with a Tiger-lily flower which advises her to walk the opposite way to reach a far off figure, Alice meets the Red Queen, who is governess like and sharp. As they both walk up to a hill that has a view like a massive chessboard, the Red Queen explains that Alice has become a pawn in a life sized chess game, in a land where everything works backwards, and must now adventure to get to the 8th square, where Alice will become Queen herself. The Red Queen exits and Alice jumps into the 3rd square, the carriage of a surreal train ride. Getting out in the 4th square, at the end of the train line, Alice enters a wood where things have no names, where people forget who they are. Alice befriends a kind fawn, before it bounds away on both of them remembering their names. Following a split path leading to the same house, Alice comes across childish Tweedle-Dum and Tweedle-Dee who argue over a rattle. She sings the old poem. ("Tweedle-Dum and Tweedle-Dee") The twins tell Alice she is only the dream of the sleeping Red King. They further annoy Alice with the dark story of the Walrus and the Carpenter who ate up oysters because they could. ("The Walrus and the Carpenter") The twins run away as a crow flies in. Alice runs further into her surroundings, and meets the White Queen who remembers things before they happen. In a magical shop, she buys an egg from an old Sheep, remembering she must meet Humpty Dumpty in the next square. As Alice suspects, the egg turns into arrogant egg Humpty Dumpty. Alice finds she is standing by his wall in the 6th square. She sings the poem, smiling to herself. ("Humpty Dumpty") Alice and Humpty argue about names, cravats, and meaning. He recites an absurd poem about waking fish up, that Alice can't understand at all. ("In winter when the fields are White...") As Alice walks away, he falls off his wall. Alice sees the White King's soldiers fall over as they try to put Humpty back together. The White King and his messengers, a Hare and a Hatter, take Alice to a small village to meet the Lion and the Unicorn from the famous rhyme, who are fighting for the White King's crown. The group sing as they run to meet them. ("The Lion and the Unicorn") Alice befriends the Unicorn who didn't believe humans exist, until it met her. The Lion meanwhile considers Alice to be a monster. Drums close in and Alice jumps to the 7th square to shield herself from the noise. In the 7th Square, the kindly White Knight (played by the same actor who plays Charles Dodgson) saves Alice from a bizarre battle with the Red Knight. He helps Alice through the thick forest. He keeps falling off his horse so Alice helps him back. He tells her about useless inventions he has made, that Alice finds very funny. Before leaving, the Knight tenderly sings Alice a nonsense song ("Haddock's Eyes (A-sitting on a Gate)") and sees her to the 8th Square, but not before falling off his horse one final time. Alice runs across the brook and realises she suddenly has a beautiful but very heavy golden crown on her head and finds she is in the 8th square and at her coronation banquet. The Looking-Glass characters greet her in joy. ("Welcome Queen Alice") The Red and White Queens, not moved by festivities, decide to "test" Alice on knowledge with questions that make no sense. Alice becomes confused and half longs for home as the two queens fall asleep on her. ("Hushaby Lady") Suddenly, the Jabberwock monster from the poem descends on the feast. Alice grabs the two queens, now small puppets, and runs through the mirror, trying to avoid the monster. She wakes with a start at home, on the rug, on the right side of the mirror. She is holding her cats Kitty and Snowdrop in her hands. She muses on the meaning of her second dream adventure and concludes her kitten Kitty was the Red Queen, and Snowdrop was the White Queen. Alice wonders if the dream of Looking-Glass World was hers or the Red King's. She again looks out the window at the snow falling, mirroring the end of act 1.

=== Epilogue: Oxford, 1862 ===
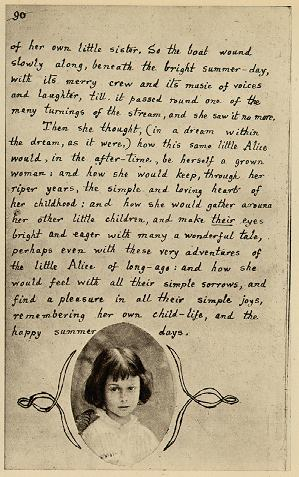
The last page of Charles Dodgson/Lewis Carroll's original manuscript of the first Alice book, then titled Alice's adventures Underground (1864). Alice Liddell's photograph is enclosed.

In Oxford on the bank of the Thames, in July 1862, it is now evening. The Liddell sisters and the rest of the boating party are preparing to go back home. Alice Liddell hears Charles Dodgson's voice calling her back to earth, as she is so immersed in his stories about the fictional Alice and her dream adventures, that she has forgotten it is the hour for leaving. Alice Liddell gets into the boat with her sisters and the two grown up friends. Before they begin rowing back, Alice Liddell implores Charles Dodgson to "Write down Alice's adventures." Charles Dodgson isn't sure if he can, but promises her he will try. The boating crew row home. ("Golden Afternoon (Reprise)")

== Main characters and cast members ==
=== 2001 World Premiere RSC cast: ===
Character	2001 Royal Shakespeare Company cast
Alice Liddell / "Alice"	Katherine Heath
Dodgson/ "Dodo" / "The White Knight"	Daniel Flynn
Duckworth/"Duck"/ "The Red Knight"	Jamie de Courcey
Lorina Liddell/ "Lory"	Rosalie Craig
Edith Liddell/ "Eaglet"	Laura Main
The White Rabbit	Richard Henders
Unseen Voice	Flora Dunn
Voice of Cake	Paul Leonard
Voice of Bottle	Sarah Redmond
Voice of Crocodile	Flora Dunn
Mouse	Adam Sims
Magpie	Sarah Quist
Canary	Flora Dunn
Caterpillar	John Conroy
Father William	Robert Horwell
Youth	Jamie Golding
Fish Footman	Christopher Key
Frog Footman	Paul Kissaun
Baby Voice	Sarah Quist
Duchess	Robert Horwell
Cook	Flora Dunn
Cheshire Cat	Sarah Redmond
Mad Hatter / Hatta	Chris Larner
March Hare / Haigha	Martin Turner
Dormouse	Marilyn Cutts
The Queen of Hearts / The Red Queen	Liza Sadovy
The Knave of Hearts	Dominic Marsh
King of Hearts	John Hodgkinson
Ace of Clubs (first soldier)	John Conroy
Gryphon	Martyn Elis
Mock Turtle	Paul Leonard
Tiger-Lily	Sarah Redmond
Goat	Mitchell Moreno
Railway Guard	John Hodgkinson
Man in White Paper	Paul Leonard
Beetle	Mark McLean
Horse	Paul Kissaun
Faun	Dominic Marsh
Tweedle-Dum	Jamie Golding
Tweedle-Dee	Adam Sims
Walrus	Robert Horwell
Carpenter	Chris Larner
Red King	Paul Leonard
White Queen / Sheep	Marilyn Cutts
Humpty Dumpty	Martyn Elis
White King	John Conroy
Lion	Mark Maclean
Unicorn	John Hodgkinson
Aged, Aged Man	Martin Turner

Note: In the script, the only specified doubling is for Dodgson/Dodo/White Knight, Edith/Eaglet, Lorina/Lory and Duckworth/Duck. Other cast doublings are up to choice. The RSC production also represents the biggest cast possible for this play, later productions have had smaller cast sizes.

== Musical numbers ==
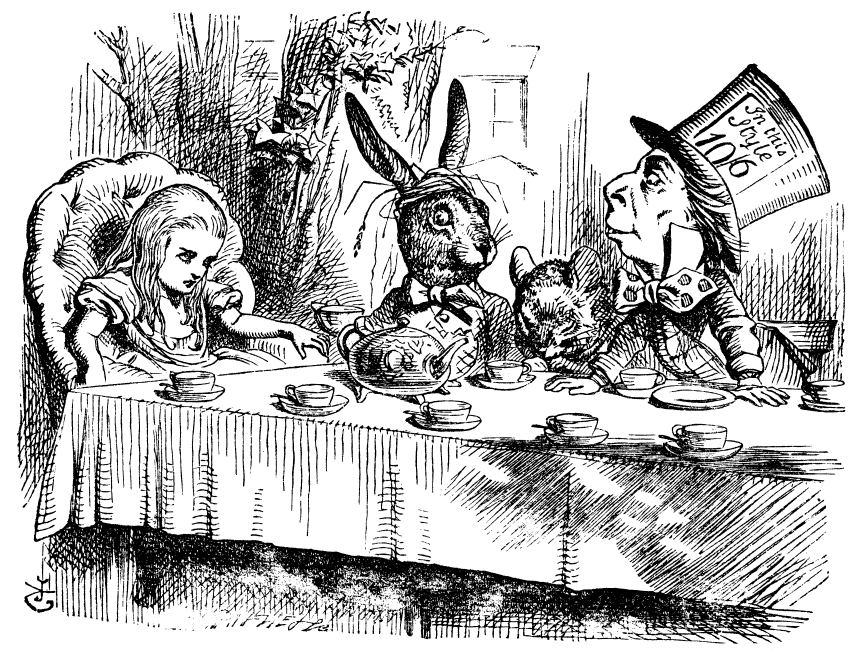
Alice takes tea with the Hatter, March Hare, and Dormouse in Wonderland. Illustration by John Tenniel for Alice's adventures in Wonderland (1865) by Lewis Carroll.

=== Act 1: Alice's Adventures in Wonderland ===
- "Golden afternoon" - Dodgson, Duckworth, Alice Liddell, Lorina Liddell, Edith Liddell and Company
- "Down, Down, Down" - Company
- "How Doth the Little Crocodile..." - Alice, Crocodile Voice
- "Fury Said to a Mouse..." - Mouse and Company
- "You are Old Father William...." - Father William, Youth
- "Wow! Wow! Wow!" - Duchess, Cook, Baby, Cheshire Cat and Company
- "Twinkle, Twinkle, Little Bat" - Hatter
- "The Lobster Quadrille" - Mock Turtle, Gryphon and Company
- "Beautiful Soup" - Mock Turtle, Gryphon and Company
- "The Queen of Hearts..." - White Rabbit
- "They told me you had been to her..." - White Rabbit

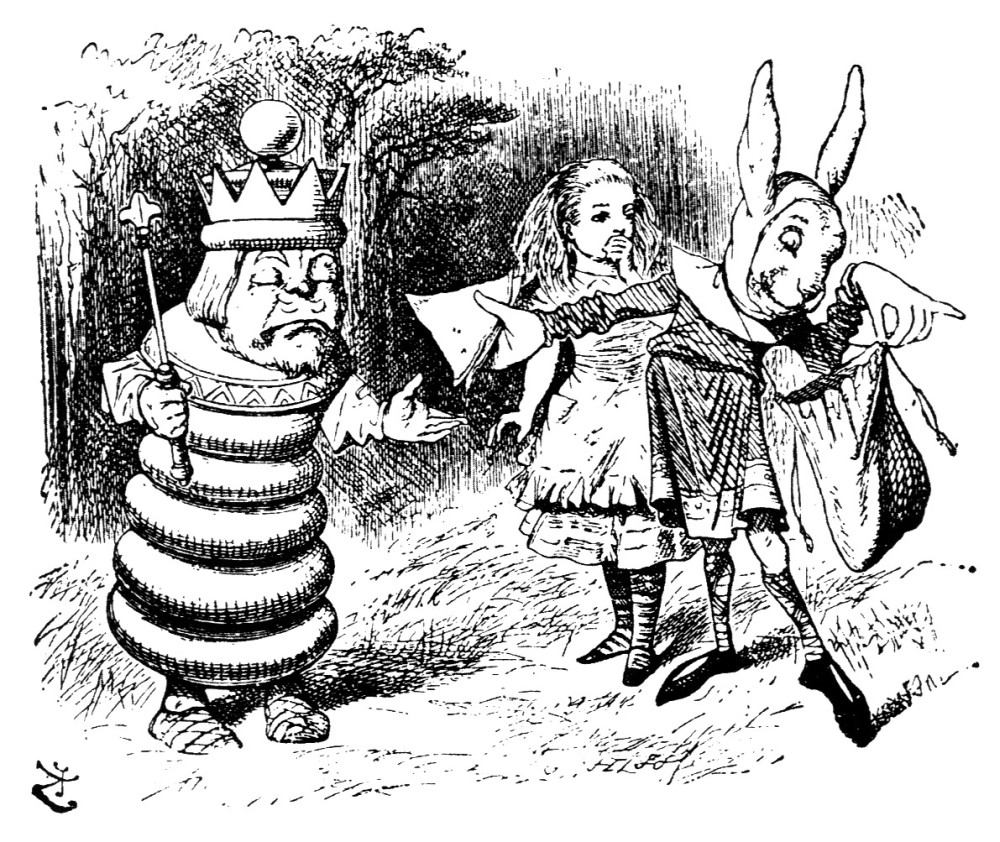
In the Looking-Glass World, Alice watches Heigha give the White King a sandwich when he feels faint. Illustration by John Tenniel for Through the Looking-Glass and what Alice found there (1872) by Lewis Carroll.

=== Act 2: Through the Looking-Glass ===
- "Moonlight on the Mirror" - Alice and Company
- "The Jabberwocky" - Alice, Father, Youth and Company
- "Tweedle-Dum and Tweedle-Dee..." - Alice and Company
- "The Walrus and the Carpenter" - Tweedle-Dum, Tweedle-Dee, Walrus, Carpenter and Company
- "Humpty Dumpty..." - Alice
- "In Winter when the fields are White..." - Humpty Dumpty
- "The Lion and the Unicorn..." - Company
- "Haddocks Eyes (A-sitting on a Gate)" - White Knight, Aged Aged Man
- "Welcome Queen Alice" - White Rabbit and Company
- "Hushaby Lady" - Red Queen, White Queen, Alice
- "Golden Afternoon (Reprise) - Dodgson, Duckworth, Alice Liddell, Lorina Liddell, Edith Liddell and Company

== Differences from the original novels ==
Despite being one of the closest adaptations yet made to Carroll's books, there are a few, mostly minor changes that Mitchell made, to help both books flow better as a stage experience:

An prologue and epilogue to both stories is created, using a framework of Dodgson telling the stories to the Liddell sisters and Robinson Duckworth. Whilst this happened in reality, it is not mentioned in Carroll's novels.

When we first meet the 7 year old fictional Alice in act 1 scene 1 of Mitchell's play, she is bored sat on the riverbank by 2 sisters, not one older one. This change was made to reference the Liddell sisters who appear in the framework story prologue and epilogue of the adaptation.

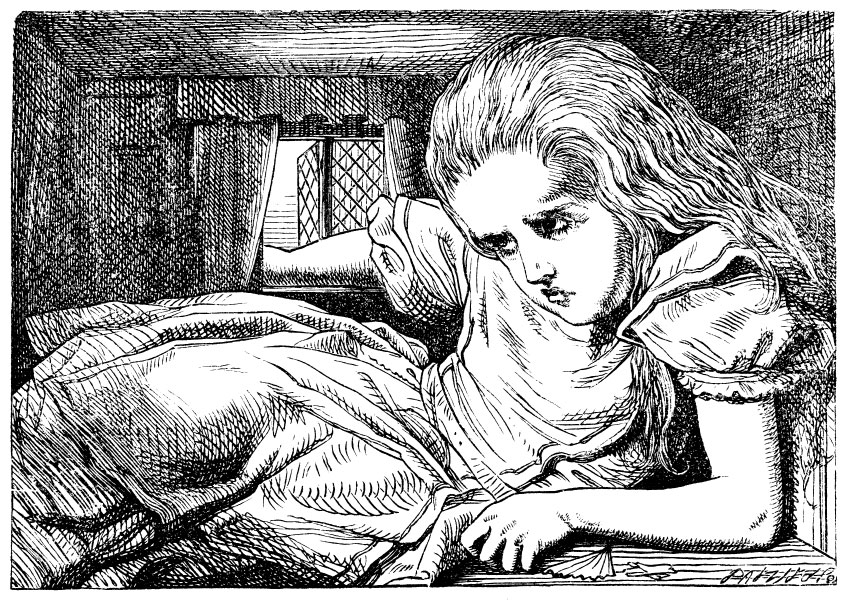
(Illustration, John Tenniel, 1865) The chapter in Alice's adventures in Wonderland where Alice is trapped after growing in the White Rabbit's house is left out of this stage adaptation due to theatre budgets and staging constraints.

The chapters in the novel, where Alice gets trapped in the white rabbit's house after searching for his gloves and fan, and annoys a Wonderland pigeon with how tall she is, are both omitted, likely due to staging constraints of the 2000s era.

At the end of act 1 of Mitchell's play, Alice awakes from her Wonderland dream in her drawing room curled in an armchair. Her sisters, who have been playing cards, realising she is awake. The drawing room setting is in a winter's evening, in contrast to the summer on the riverbank. In the novel, Alice both falls asleep and wakes up on the riverbank by her sister, and the setting is not implied to have been part of her dream.

Through the Looking-Glass occurs 6 months after Alice's adventures in Wonderland. Mitchell's play has both of Alice's dreams happen possibly on one day or in an unspecified short period of time.

The opening argument in the Looking-Glass act of the play, about chess, between the 3 sisters, does not occur in the novels. It is invented to give a transition from one book to another. The scene before Alice reads Jabberwocky, where she discovers sentient chess pieces in the Looking-Glass House, is omitted from the play. The garden of live flowers contains more critical flowers who annoy Alice. In Mitchell's play, she only meets Tiger-lily. The train ride in square 3 ends in the novel with a difficult to stage transition to a forest. It is cut to a more simple train stop. Alice also does not discuss looking-Glass insects with the Gnat in the play.

In the novel, Alice's dream of Looking-Glass World ends with a chaotic banquet where she is introduced to talking food, and given a riddle about fish from the White Queen, before everything explodes into mayhem. Alice takes the Red Queen, who has grown small, and shakes her until Alice wakes in her drawing room, holding Kitty. The play has a more abrupt end to the 2nd dream, of a jabberwock attack and a sudden awakening in the drawing room. This happens right after Alice is quizzed on useful questions by the Red and White Queens. The Jabberwock monster does not appear again in the novel. This is a change likely made for a more theatrical ending.

== Original Royal Shakespeare Company 2001 production and background ==
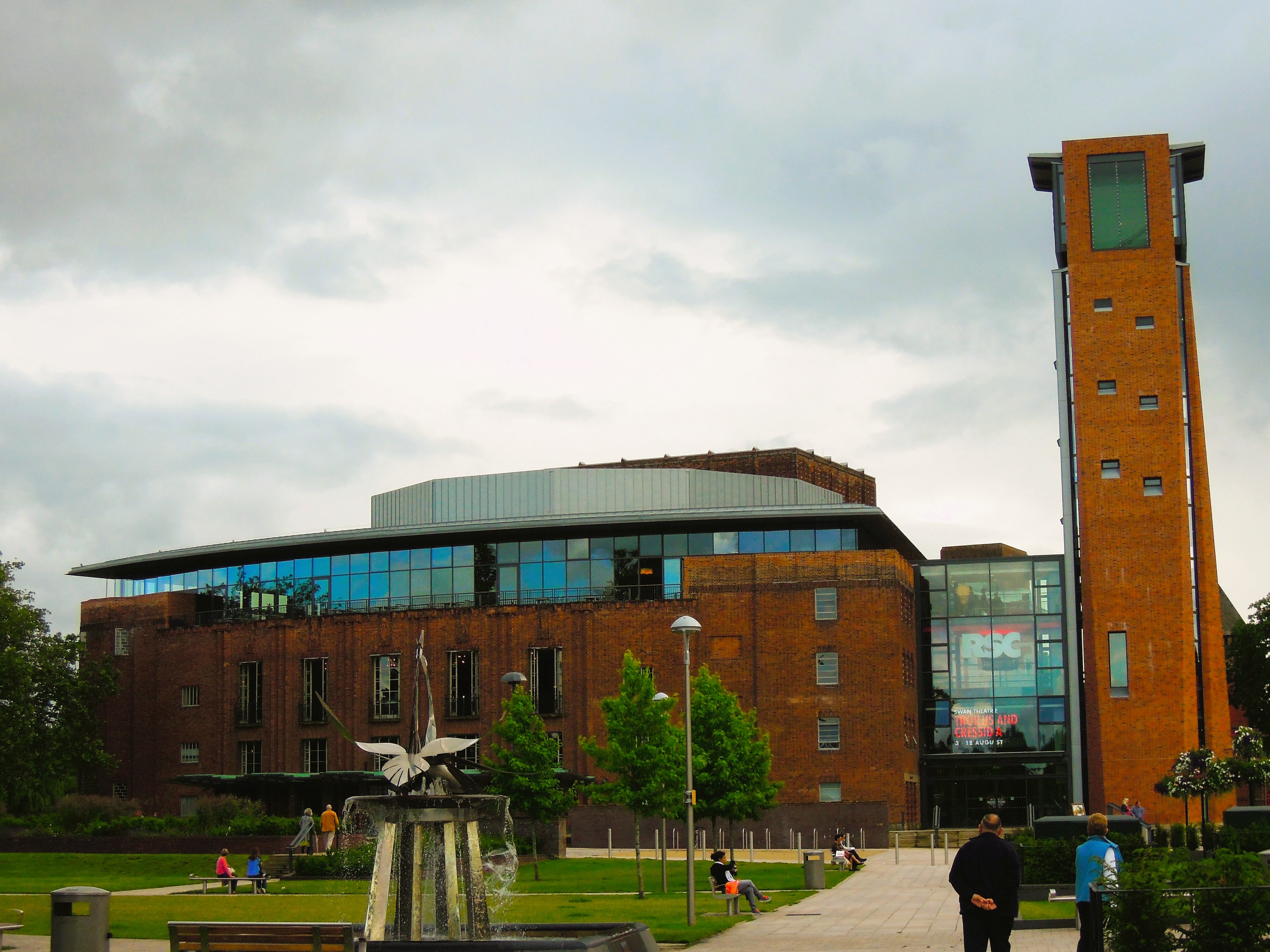
The play was first produced in 2001 by the RSC (Royal Shakespeare Company), UK, before being licensed worldwide from 2009.

Alice in Wonderland & Through the Looking-Glass was commissioned by the Royal Shakespeare Company at a time when the company was having funding and internal issues.

A staff strike of technicians coincided to happen as Alice premiered in October 2001.The staff strikes were due to unhappiness at preposed redundancies. A contributing factor to the strikes was also RSC director Adrian Noble's plans for abolishing the RSC's main Stratford theatre with several regional Shakespeare theatre hubs (a plan which was eventually scrapped).

The RSC production of Mitchell's Alice was produced by Denise Wood and directed by Rachel Kavanaugh. Terry Davies and Stephen Warbeck composed for the songs and incidental music. The set, designed by Peter Mackintosh, had the two key colours of a green set with red backgrounds and props, including a large golden video projection hole at the back of the set. In the Wonderland act this depicted trees, Alice falling into Wonderland, forest, or sky. In the Looking-Glass act, the video projection became a large gold mirror which showed a background of chessboard patterned hills. Puppetry was used to depict Alice's shrinking and growing in Wonderland, for the Wonderland court at the end of act 1, and for the Jabberwock in Looking-Glass World.

== Critical reception ==
=== Original Royal Shakespeare Company 2001 production ===
Despite selling well with audiences at the RSC, the critical reception of the production was mixed to negative. The review in The Independent called the original 2001 Royal Shakespeare Company production "a magic-free tundra of non-idiosyncrasy" and its Alice, played by Katherine Heath, "charmless". The Guardian thought it faithful to Carroll's text, but called it a game of two halves, Wonderland working well enough, but that Looking-Glass went "off the boil."

Media studies scholar Will Brooker noted in his 2004 cultural research on Lewis Carroll and the Alice books, that some of the negative reviews of the RSC production, could be interpreted as the play not fitting into the media discourse around the novels at that time. Brooker notes that reviewing journalists wanted "dark undertones" in how Wonderland and Looking-Glass World were portrayed. Brooker further adds that Mitchell's script, being family friendly, did not offer this fully. Another factor in how Mitchell's play was received by the press in its first production possibly stems from the turmoil Royal Shakespeare Company was in during 2001.

=== Revivals ===
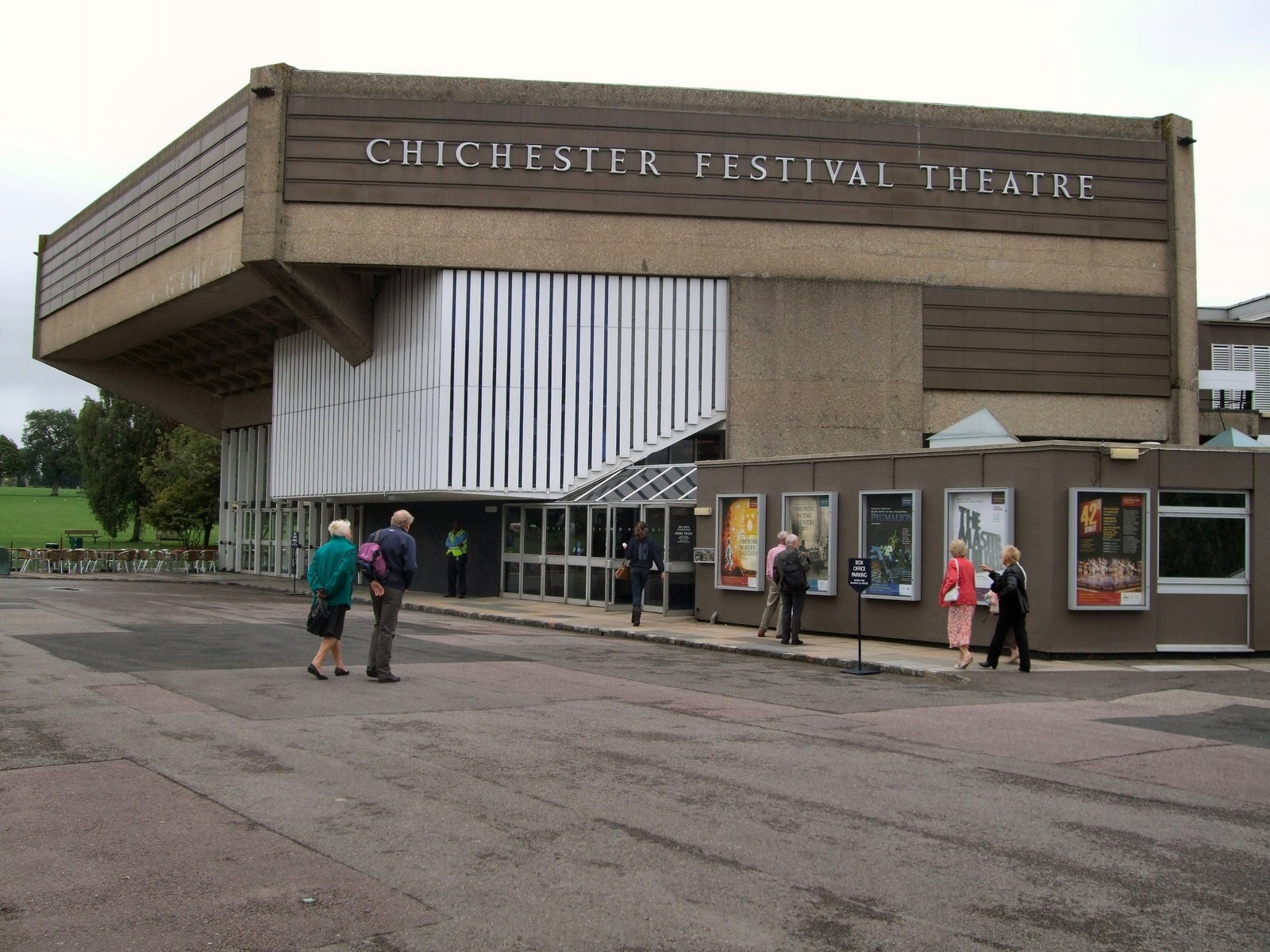
The 2010 Chichester Festival Theatre production marked the play's first professional revival.

Since its premiere, Alice in Wonderland & Through the Looking-Glass has been regularly seen at other companies and in other locations. In December 2009, the play was produced by the University of Essex, soon after the play had entered into licensing by Samuel French/Concord theatricals. Away from its divisive premiere, Mitchell's play has since become a popular staple of youth, student, regional and amateur theatre, in particular with universities youth companies, regional theatres, and schools due to its easy licensing availability, large flexible cast list, and faithfulness to Carroll's original novels.

Alice in Wonderland & Through the Looking-Glass received a significant professional revival at the Chichester Festival Theatre in 2010, by the Youth Theatre, as directed by Dale Rooks. Emily Dyble and Winter Loseby alternated as Alice. The revival featured new set designs by Simon Higlett and puppetry by Toby Olié. This revival, unlike its premiere, received more positive reviews, The Argus noting Emily Dyble's "delightful" performance as Alice. This revival reused the song arrangements composed by Terry Davies and Stephen Warbeck for the RSC production.

The 2014 Stamford Shakespeare Company production at Tolethorpe Hall marked the first time the play had been performed in an outdoor theatre setting. It received largely positive reviews by the visiting public.

The 2022 revival by ARTComedia and Jersey Arts centre, with a smaller cast of 13 actors, also received a positive response, with the Bailwick Express Jersey observing that "the sheer scale of the madness played out over the two hours beggars any kind of coherent description, as it should." Other productions such as Courtyard Theatre's have been praised for being "vibrant, colourful and energetic". The play was first produced in North America in the United States by the community Majestic Theatre, in Oregon, in 2016. A themed "tea with the hatter" event ran alongside the play, where audiences could experience the Wonderland act 1 tea party with the production's actors from that scene.

== See also ==
- Eva Le Gallienne and Florida Friebus's 1932 Alice in Wonderland, first performed at Civic Repertory Theatre New York, and filmed several times, which is not to be confused with this Adrian Mitchell 2001 stage version.
