= George Edward Watts =

British Royal Navy officer (1786–1860)

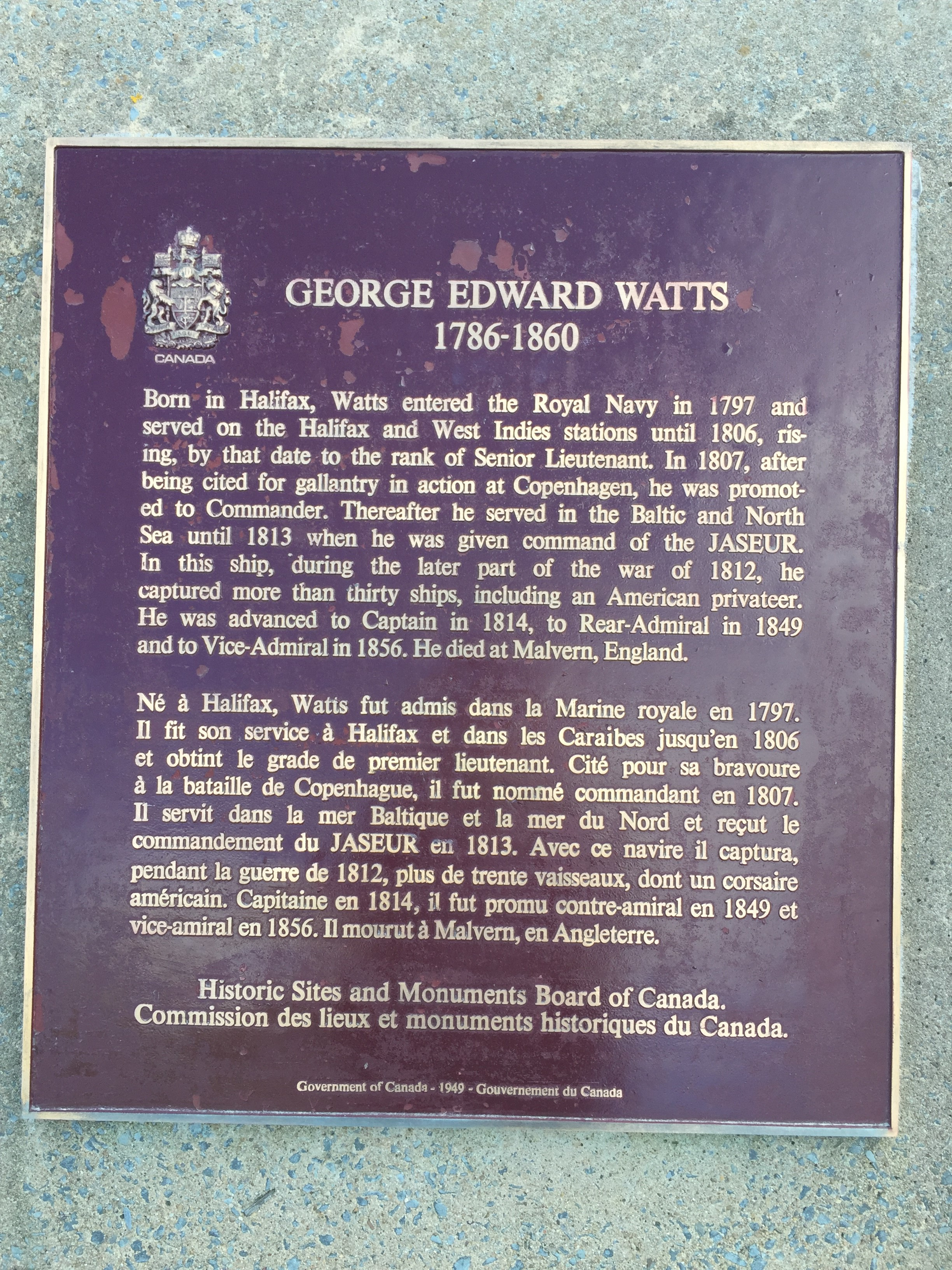
George Edward Watts, CFB Halifax, Nova Scotia

George Edward Watts (1786 – December 2, 1860) commanded a Royal Navy ship during the War of 1812.

He was born in Halifax, Nova Scotia, the son of John Watts and Agnes Skene, and entered the Royal Navy in 1797. He served in Halifax, the West Indies and the North Sea. Watts commanded HMS Jaseur during the War of 1812, capturing more than 30 ships. He was promoted to captain in 1814, to Rear-admiral in 1849 and to Vice-Admiral in 1856. In 1820, he married Jane Waldie.

Watts died at Malvern at the age of 74. He is commemorated in the Admiralty Garden in CFB Halifax.
