= Walter Barrington, 9th Viscount Barrington =

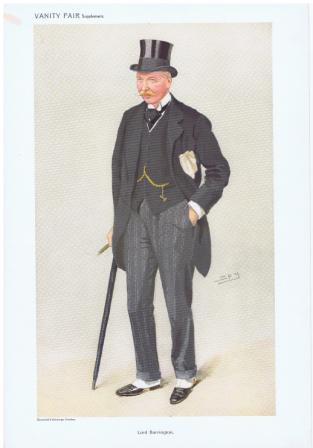
Lord Barrington caricatured by "Spy" in Vanity Fair, 1909

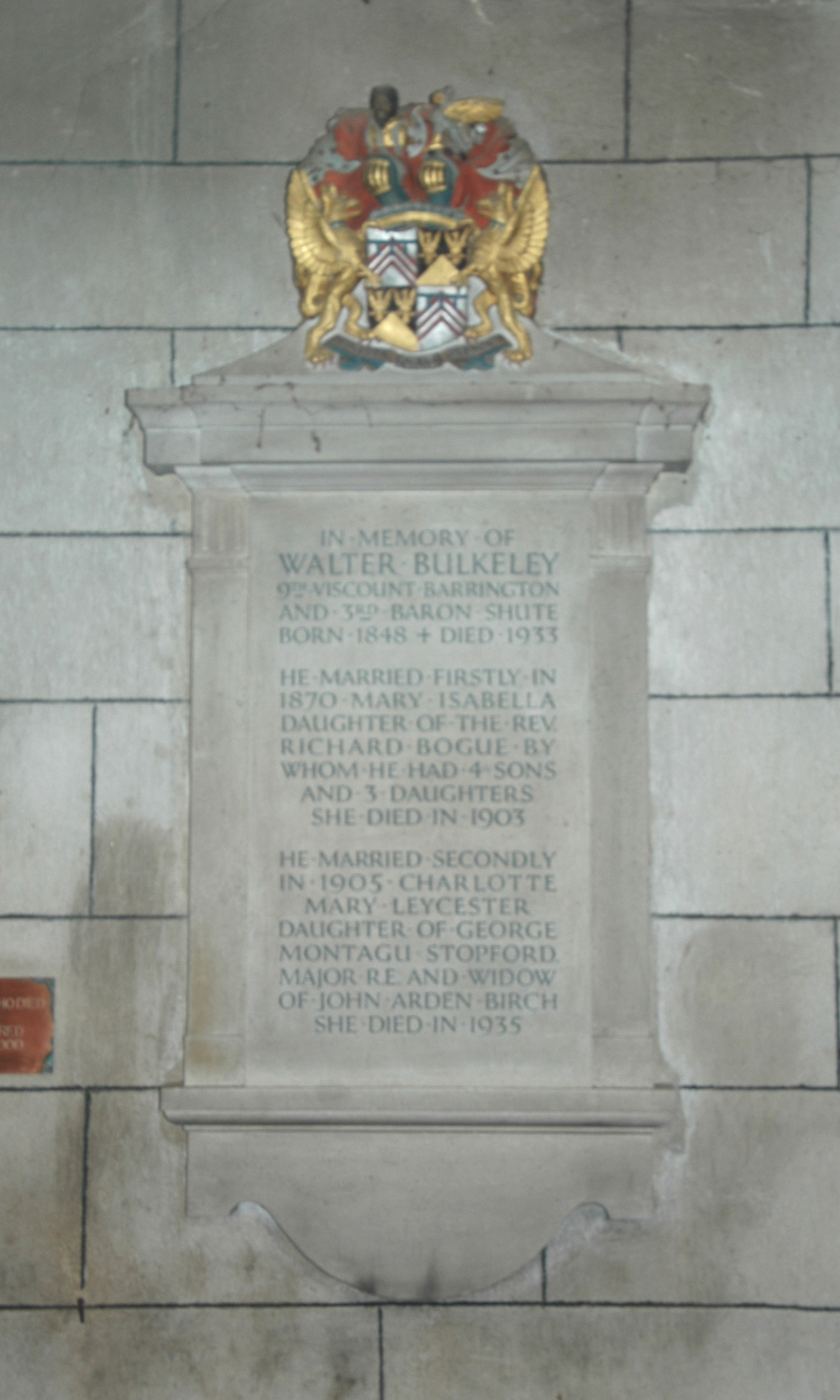
Limestone monument to Walter Bulkeley Barrington in St Andrew's parish church, Shrivenham

Walter Bulkeley Barrington, 9th Viscount Barrington JP, DL (20 April 1848 – 12 September 1933), was a peer of the United Kingdom.

Walter Barrington born on 20 April 1848 at Tusmore, Oxfordshire, the son of Percy Barrington, 8th Viscount Barrington, and Louisa Higgins. He was educated at Eton College. He served in the Coldstream Guards and was a Justice of the Peace and Deputy Lieutenant of Berkshire.

In 1870, he married Mary Isabella Bogue (c. 1848 – 1903) with whom he had seven children, including William Barrington, 10th Viscount Barrington. In 1905, he married Charlotte Stopford.

One of the Barrington family seats was Beckett Hall, Shrivenham, Berkshire (since 1974 in Oxfordshire). Charlotte endowed Shrivenham Memorial Hall, which was opened in 1925 by Princess Beatrice, daughter of Queen Victoria.

In 1911 he was one of the 112 peers who voted against the passing of the Parliament Act 1911.

== Notes ==
Peerage of Ireland
Preceded by Percy Barrington	Viscount Barrington; 1901–1933	Succeeded by William Barrington
Peerage of the United Kingdom
Preceded by Percy Barrington	Baron Shute; 1901–1933	Succeeded by William Barrington
