= Jane Watts =

British

- Born: 1793
- Died: 1826 (aged 32–33)
- Known for: landscape painting
- Spouse: George Edward Watts
- Children: one

Jane Watts born Jane Waldie (1793–1826) was a British artist and author born to a Scottish and Northumbrian family.

== Life ==
Jane Waldie was born in 1793, the daughter of George and Ann (born Ormston) Waldie, variously of Hendersyde Park, Roxburghshire; Kingswood, Northumberland; and Forth House, Newcastle upon Tyne. Her elder sister, Charlotte Anne Eaton, was also a writer and artist.

Her accomplishments - which appear to have been "astonishing skill in painting" - were sufficiently noted to gain her a place in Men of Mark 'twixt Tyne and Tweed, an 1895 three volume set of biographies of local worthies in which she is one of only two women featured; and an extended entry in The Annual Biography and Obituary for 1827.

From a young age, Waldie painted pictures of local scenery. She was largely self-taught, receiving a few lessons from a Kelso artist, and learning to mix colours from a commercial sign-writer. She studied for three months under Alexander Nasmyth, albeit her obituary makes clear that his instruction was unhelpful. The Dictionary of National Biography asserts that the figures in three or four of her paintings were by Sir Robert Ker Porter, but she exhibited in her own name at Somerset House in 1819 a painting titled The Temple at Pæstum. Her obituary speaks of her having completed 40 or 50 oil paintings, and in addition, watercolours and pencil architectural drawings.

Jane Waldie, her sister Charlotte and brother John travelled to Belgium and Holland in 1815. They were in Brussels on the night before the Battle of Quatre Bras, and withdrew to Antwerp before the Battle of Waterloo, returning to visit the battlefield a fortnight later. She and her sister wrote an account of their experiences watching the coalition armies leaving Brussels on the night of 15 June 1815; the rumour and panic which ensued during the next couple of days; and the sight of the wounded returning from the battles in the days after 18 June. It was published in 1817 under the title of Narrative of a Residence in Belgium, during the Campaign of 1815, and of a Visit to the Field of Waterloo.

In September 1816 she accompanied her sister Charlotte on an extended continental trip, returning the following August. She wrote a four volume account of her travels entitled Sketches descriptive of Italy in 1816–17; with a brief Account of Travels in various parts of France and Switzerland, which was published in 1820.

In October 1817 she married George Augustus Watts of Langton Grange near Staindrop.

She died on 6 July 1826 of complications arising from an accident and exacerbated by the birth of her only child, a son who died in infancy.

The painter Robert Edmonstone, a Kelso native and contemporary of Waldie, created a portrait of her, after her death, based on miniatures made whilst she was alive.

== Works ==
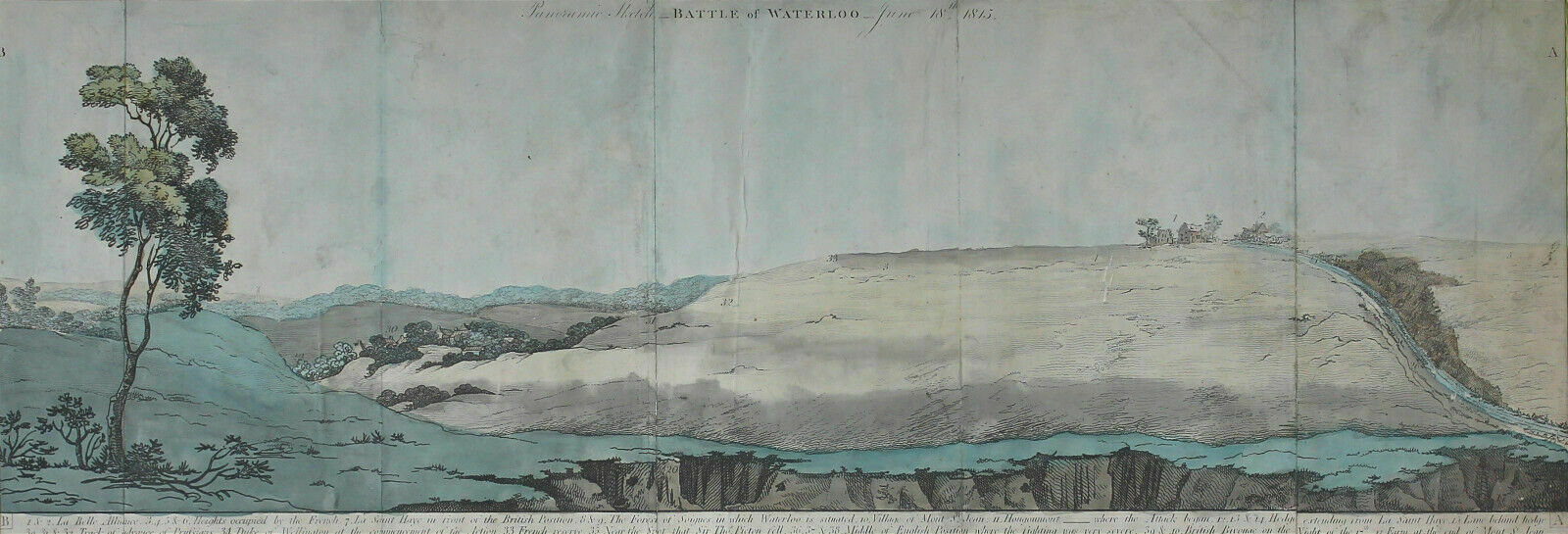
The Sight of the Battle of Waterloo, by Jane Waldie, 1815

- Narrative of a residence in Belgium during the campaign of 1815; and a visit to the field of Waterloo (1817)
- Sketches descriptive of Italy in 1816–17; with a brief Account of Travels in various parts of France and Switzerland (1820)
  - four volumes via HathiTrust
  - Volume I
  - Volume II
  - Volume III
  - Volume IV
