= Charlotte Anne Eaton =

English travel writer, memoirist and novelist

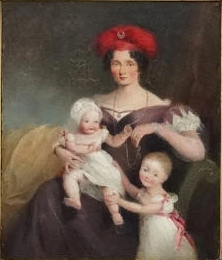
- Eaton by Margaret Sarah Carpenter
- Born: Charlotte Anne Waldie; 28 September 1788
- Died: 28 April 1859 (aged 70)
- Occupations: banker; writer

Charlotte Anne Eaton (1788–1859), née Waldie, was an English banker, travel writer, memoirist and novelist.

== Life ==
Born on 28 September 1788, she was second daughter of George Waldie of Hendersyde Park, Roxburghshire, by his wife Ann, eldest daughter of Jonathan Ormston of Newcastle-upon-Tyne; her youngest sister, Jane Watts (1793–1826), was known as a writer and artist.

On 22 August 1822, she married Stephen Eaton (1780–1834) of Ketton Hall, Rutland. Her husband was a partner in the Eaton, Cayley & Co. Bank in Stamford (later The Stamford, Spalding and Boston Banking Co.). She carried on the business as senior partner after the death of her husband until her own death. The Stamford, Spalding and Boston bank was amalgamated into Barclays in 1911.

Eaton died at 17, Hanover Square, Westminster, on 28 April 1859.

== Works ==
In June 1815 Waldie was on a family visit to Brussels, coinciding with the Waterloo campaign. She and her sister, Jane Waldie, wrote an account of her experiences, published in 1817 under the title of Narrative of a Residence in Belgium, during the Campaign of 1815, and of a Visit to the Field of Waterloo. A second edition was published in 1853 as The Days of Battle, or Quatre Bras and Waterloo; by an Englishwoman resident in Brussels in June 1815. The edition of 1888 was entitled Waterloo Days. The book was heavily quoted by Augustus Hare.

In 1820 she published anonymously, in three volumes, Rome in the Nineteenth Century: containing a complete account of the ruins of the ancient city, the remains of the Middle Ages and the monuments of modern times : with remarks on the fine arts, on the state of society, and on the religious ceremonies, manners and customs of the modern Romans : in a series of letters written during a residence at Rome in the years 1817 and 1818; second and third editions appeared respectively in 1822 and 1823. A fifth edition, in two volumes, was published in 1852, and a sixth in 1860.

As Mrs Eaton, she wrote:

- Continental Adventures, a story, London, 1826, 3 vols.
- At Home and Abroad, a novel, London, 1831, 3 vols.

== Family ==
In 1822, Charlotte Waldie married Stephen Eaton, a banker of Ketton Hall, Rutland; he died on 25 September 1834. They had two sons and two daughters. Charles Ormston Eaton (1827–1907) was a son.

== Notes ==
Attribution

- This article incorporates text from a publication now in the public domain: Lee, Sidney, ed. (1899). "Waldie, Charlotte Ann". Dictionary of National Biography. Vol. 59. London: Smith, Elder & Co.
- Taylor, Clare L. "Eaton [née Waldie], Charlotte Anne". Oxford Dictionary of National Biography (online ed.). Oxford University Press. doi:10.1093/ref:odnb/28447. (Subscription, Wikipedia Library access or UK public library membership required.)
