= Gerald Robarts =

British army officer and banker

- Born: 15 April 1878; Buckinghamshire, United Kingdom
- Died: 27 December 1961 (aged 83); Buckinghamshire
- Occupation: Banker
- Known for: Director of Coutts & Co. until 1931
- Spouse: Ethel Florence Fletcher (m. 1905)
- Children: 3
- Military career
- Allegiance: United Kingdom
- Branch: British Army
- Service years: 1900–1917
- Rank: Captain
- Units: 7th Queen's Own Hussars, Royal Horse Guards, Northamptonshire Yeomanry
- Conflicts: Second Boer War; World War I

Gerald Robarts (15 April 1878 – 27 December 1961) was a British Army officer, banker, and leading squash rackets player. He was a director of Coutts & Co. until 1931.

== Early life ==
Robarts was born in Buckinghamshire on 15 April 1878. He was the second son of Abraham John Robarts and the former Hon. Edith Barrington, a daughter of Percy Barrington, 8th Viscount Barrington. He had an older brother, John, and four sisters, Mary Edith, Elsie, Marjorie Alice, and Laura Louise.

Although Robarts's father was the tenant at Lillingstone Dayrell of the Dayrell family, in 1868 he paid for the restoration of the parish church. He was High Sheriff of Buckinghamshire in 1869, and in 1882 he built Tile House, Lillingstone Dayrell, where he later lived, designed by Ewan Christian and described by Pevsner as "Neo-Elizabethan, big and forbidding with groups of huge chimneys. His grandson David was High Sheriff in 1963.

Through his paternal grandmother, Elizabeth Sarah Smyth, Robarts was a descendant of Henry FitzRoy, 1st Duke of Grafton, an illegitimate son of King Charles II. The third Duke’s daughter Lady Georgiana Fitzroy (1757–1799), married John Smyth, a Whig politician, who was Robarts's great-grandfather. His father's first cousin Diana Elizabeth Smyth married Henry Lascelles, 4th Earl of Harewood, and her great-grandson George Lascelles was the husband of Mary, Princess Royal, only daughter of George V.

Robarts's father, Abraham, was the last of an unbroken line all called Abraham Robarts stretching back to the 17th century. His father had two sons, and he had three, but none of them was named Abraham.

== Career ==
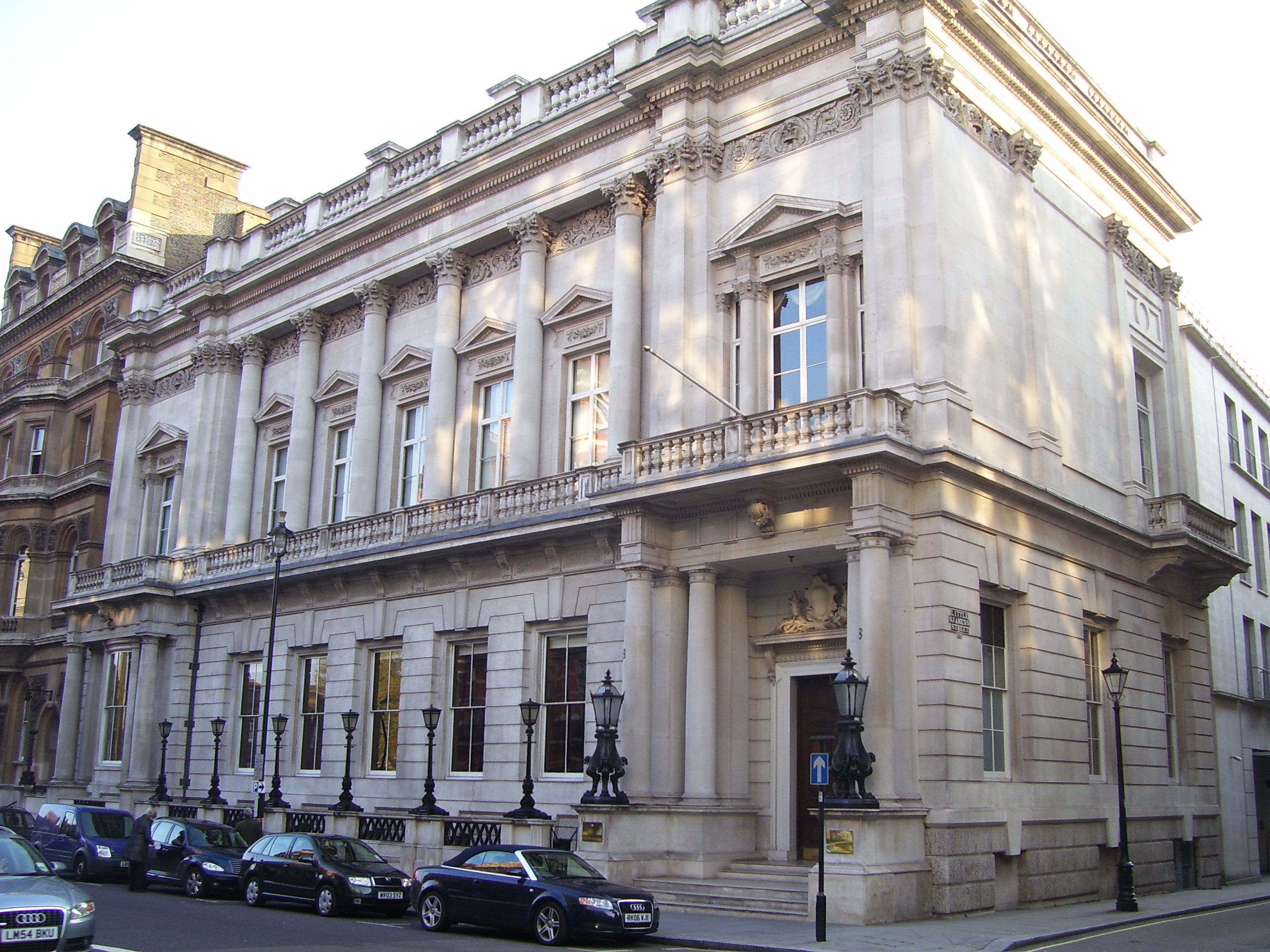
The Bath Club

The Robarts family had been bankers since the founding of Robarts, Curtis & Co. in 1791. This later became Robarts, Lubbock & Co., and in 1914 merged with Coutts & Co. The partners in Robarts, Lubbock, and Co. were Abraham John Robarts, John William Lubbock, and his son John Lubbock, in 1900 created Lord Avebury.

He was a director of Coutts & Co. until 1931, when his seat on the board was taken over by his son David Robarts. In 1927 he was a Land Tax Commissioner, and was then of Lillingstone House, Lillingstone Dayrell, Buckingham.

An active member of the Bath Club, in 1924 Robarts travelled as part of a British squash team visiting the United States and won the first American Squash Racquets Singles Championship, defeating William F. Harrity of Philadelphia in the final.

=== Military career ===
Robarts was commissioned as a second lieutenant into the 7th Queen's Own Hussars on 24 March 1900, and was promoted to lieutenant on 29 November of that year. He went out to South Africa, seeing action in the Second Boer War from 1901 to 1902, including the fighting at Springs, Transvaal, on 1 April 1902.

In 1911 he was commissioned into the Royal Horse Guards and in 1912 transferred to the Northamptonshire Yeomanry. He served until 1917, seeing active service during the First World War and rising to the rank of captain.

== Personal life ==
On 18 July 1905, at St George's, Hanover Square, he married Ethel Florence Fletcher. They had three sons:

- David John Robarts (1906–1989), who was educated at Eton and Oxford and by 1954 was the chairman of the National Provincial Bank. He was later the second chairman of the new National Westminster Bank.
- Anthony Vere Cyprian Robarts (1910–1982), who was also educated at Eton and joined the 11th Hussars regiment before WW2, seeing service in Egypt, was promoted to Lieut-Colonel; m. 1935, Grizel Mary (Gid) Grant; 2 sons, 2 daughters.
- Peter Robarts (1915–1951), who became a squadron leader in the Royal Air Force and was killed in a flying accident.

Robarts and his wife inherited a collection of 17th-century Dutch paintings from Abraham and opened their garden at Lillingstone House to the public through the National Gardens Scheme. It was notable for flowering shrubs and flowering trees.

Robarts died in Buckinghamshire on 27 December 1961, aged 83, and was buried at Lillingstone Dayrell.
