= George Barrington, 7th Viscount Barrington =

British Conservative politician (1824–1886)

The Right Honourable The Viscount Barrington PC
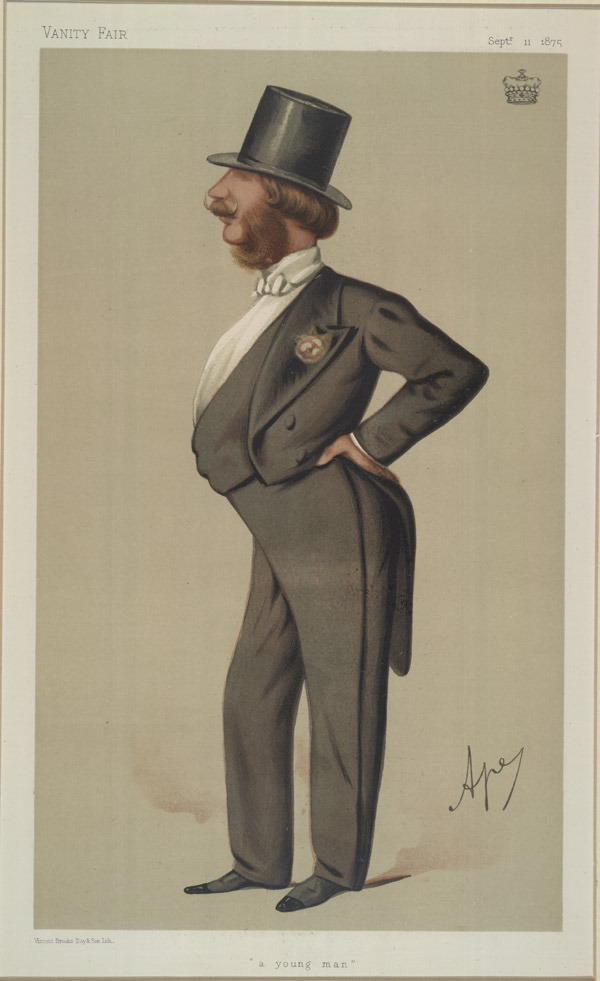
- "a young man". Caricature by "Ape" (Carlo Pellegrini) published in Vanity Fair in 1875.

Captain of the Yeomen of the Guard
- In office 27 June 1885 – 28 January 1886
- Monarch: Victoria
- Prime Minister: The Marquess of Salisbury
- Preceded by: The Lord Monson
- Succeeded by: The Lord Monson

Captain of the Gentlemen-at-Arms
- In office 5 August 1886 – 6 November 1886
- Monarch: Victoria
- Prime Minister: The Marquess of Salisbury
- Preceded by: The Lord Sudeley
- Succeeded by: The Earl of Rosslyn

Personal details
- Born: 14 February 1824 Lower Brook Street, London
- Died: 6 November 1886 (aged 62) Grimsthorpe Castle, Lincolnshire
- Party: Conservative
- Spouse: Isabel Morritt (m. 1846)
- Relations: William Craven, 4th Earl of Craven (grandson); William Barrington (brother)
- Parent: William Barrington, 6th Viscount Barrington (father)
- Education: Christ Church, Oxford

George William Barrington, 7th Viscount Barrington, PC (14 February 1824 – 6 November 1886), was a British Conservative politician. He held office under Lord Salisbury as Captain of the Yeomen of the Guard between 1885 and 1886 and as Captain of the Honourable Corps of Gentlemen-at-Arms in 1886.

== Early life ==
Barrington was born at Lower Brook Street, London, on 14 February 1824. He was the eldest son of William Barrington, 6th Viscount Barrington, and his wife the Hon. Jane Elizabeth, daughter of Thomas Liddell, 1st Baron Ravensworth. His younger brother was the diplomat William Barrington.

He was educated at Christ Church, Oxford.

== Career ==
Barrington was returned to Parliament for Eye in 1866. The following year he succeeded his father in the viscountcy but as this was an Irish peerage he did not have to resign his seat in the House of Commons. In 1874 he was sworn of the Privy Council and appointed Vice-Chamberlain of the Household in the Conservative administration of Benjamin Disraeli, a post he held until the government was defeated in the 1880 general election.

The latter year Barrington was created Baron Shute, of Beckett in the County of Berkshire, in the Peerage of the United Kingdom, which entitled him to an automatic seat in the House of Lords. The title was created with special remainder to his younger brother Percy. Barrington later served under Lord Salisbury as Captain of the Yeomen of the Guard from 1885 to January 1886 and as Captain of the Honourable Corps of Gentlemen-at-Arms between August 1886 and his sudden death in November of the same year.

== Personal life ==
On 19 February 1846, Lord Barrington was married to Isabel Elizabeth, daughter of John Morritt of Rokeby Park and Mary Baillie (a daughter of Peter Baillie of Dochfour). Together, they had three daughters:

- Hon. Constance Mary Barrington (1847–1926), who married Lawrence Palk, 2nd Baron Haldon.
- Hon. Evelyn Laura Barrington (1848–1924), who married George Craven, 3rd Earl of Craven.
- Hon. Florence Isabel Barrington (d. 1928), who became a Sister of the Community of St Mary the Virgin.

He died in office at Grimsthorpe Castle, Lincolnshire, in November 1886, after a few hours illness, aged 62. He was succeeded in his titles (in the barony of Shute according to the special remainder) by his younger brother Percy. Lady Barrington died in February 1898.

Parliament of the United Kingdom
Preceded by Sir Edward Kerrison, Bt	Member of Parliament for Eye; 1866–1880	Succeeded by Ellis Ashmead-Bartlett
Political offices
Preceded by Lord Richard Grosvenor	Vice-Chamberlain of the Household; 1874–1880	Succeeded by Lord Charles Bruce
Preceded by The Lord Monson	Captain of the Yeomen of the Guard; 1885–1886	Succeeded by The Lord Monson
Preceded by The Lord Sudeley	Captain of the Honourable Corps of Gentlemen-at-Arms; 1886	Succeeded by The Earl of Rosslyn
Peerage of Ireland
Preceded by William Barrington	Viscount Barrington; 1867–1886	Succeeded by Percy Barrington
Peerage of the United Kingdom
New creation	Baron Shute; 1880–1886	Succeeded by Percy Barrington
