= Charles Ormston Eaton =

English cricketer and banker (1827–1907)

Personal information
- Full name: Charles Ormston Eaton
- Born: 25 January 1827; Ketton, Rutland, England
- Died: 14 September 1907 (aged 80); Little Casterton, Rutland, England
- Batting: Unknown
- Relatives: Hubert Eaton (son)

Domestic team information
- Years: Team
- 1849–1853: Marylebone Cricket Club

Career statistics
Competition	First-class
Matches	3
Runs scored	21
Batting average	4.20
100s/50s	–/–
Top score	9*
Catches/stumpings	–/–
- Source: Cricinfo, 25 January 2023

Charles Ormston Eaton (25 January 1827 – 14 September 1907) was an English banker and first-class cricketer. He was born at Ketton Hall and died at Tolethorpe Hall, both in Rutland.

Eaton was educated at Harrow and Trinity College, Cambridge. He graduated from Cambridge University with a Bachelor of Arts degree in 1849, which was converted to a Master of Arts in 1852. He played first-class cricket in three matches between 1847 and 1853. His first game in 1847 was for a so-called "England" eleven that included some of the foremost cricketers of the day; his other first-class matches were for the Marylebone Cricket Club (MCC) and he did not play in any important games while at Cambridge University.

He was a director of the Eaton, Cayley & Co. Bank in Stamford (later The Stamford, Spalding and Boston Banking Co.) in which his father Stephen Ormston Eaton (1780–1834) had been a partner. His mother Charlotte Anne Eaton (née Waldie), as well as being a published author, carried on the banking business as senior partner after the death of her husband until her own death in 1859. The bank was amalgamated into Barclays in 1911.

He was a generous benefactor of the Roman Catholic Church of St Mary and St Augustine, Stamford, purchasing the site and paying for an organ.

Eaton bought the Tolethorpe estate in 1864 and carried out a major reconstruction of the hall and formal gardens. He was also a justice of the peace for Northamptonshire, the Liberty of Peterborough and Rutland, and was Sheriff of Rutland in 1864. He married Elizabeth Jane, daughter of Robert Hedley of Sidbrook, Somerset, in 1858, and their son, Hubert, was also Sheriff of Rutland in 1906.
