= George Campbell (cricketer, born 1847) =

English cricketer

Personal information
- Full name: George Augustus Campbell
- Born: 7 July 1847; Tunbridge Wells, Kent, England
- Died: 12 September 1930 (aged 83); Brackley, Northamptonshire, England
- Batting: Unknown
- Relatives: Hubert Eaton (son-in-law)

Domestic team information
- Years: Team
- 1866: Lancashire

Career statistics
Competition	First-class
Matches	1
Runs scored	18
Batting average	9.00
100s/50s	–/–
Top score	10
Balls bowled	–
Wickets	–
Bowling average	–
5 wickets in innings	–
10 wickets in match	–
Best bowling	–
Catches/stumpings	–/–
- Source: Cricinfo, 4 September 2012

George Augustus Campbell (7 July 1847 – 12 September 1930) was an English cricketer.

== Early life ==
George was the son of Colonel Herbert Frederick Campbell of Evenley Hall and his wife, Louisa Cox. He was born in Tunbridge Wells, Kent, and was educated at Wellington College, where he first attended in 1860. His family was of Scottish descent and could trace their roots back to the 2nd Earl of Argyll.

== Career ==
Campbell made a single first-class appearance for Lancashire against Surrey in 1866 at Wavertree Road Ground, Liverpool. Surrey won the toss and elected to field first, with Lancashire being put into bat. In their first inning, Lancashire made 125 all out, with Campbell being dismissed for 10 runs by Frederick Miller. Surrey then responded in their first inning by making 116 runs, with Lancashire then making 86 runs in their second inning, in which Campbell was dismissed for 8 runs by George Griffith. Surrey reached 96/7 in their second innings to win the match by three wickets. This was his only major appearance for Lancashire. Campbell's batting style is unknown.

=== Later career ===
He was also a keen hunter and, for eleven years, the Secretary to the Grafton Hounds. Politically, he was a Conservative and was for many years President of the Brackley Conservative Association. In business, he was a partner in a firm of bankers and army agents, Cox and Company, which was formed through connections in his mother's family.

== Personal life ==
On 23 July 1868, Campbell was married to Hon. Alice Louisa Barrington (d. 1928), the elder daughter of Percy Barrington, 8th Viscount Barrington and the former Louisa Higgins. Together, George and Alice lived at Market House in Brackley and were the parents of five children, including:

- Sir Archibald Henry Campbell (1870–1948), who married Hon. Beryl Dawnay, a daughter of Hugh Dawnay, 8th Viscount Downe.
- Evelyn Mary Campbell (b. 1874), who married Hubert Francis Eaton, also a first-class cricket player, in 1894.

He died at Brackley, Northamptonshire, on 12 September 1930. His funeral was well attended, with distinguished mourners such as Archibald Campbell, the then Chairman of the London Stock Exchange, and Oliver Fitzroy, who attended as a representative of the Speaker of the House of Commons, Edward FitzRoy.
