= Hubert Eaton (cricketer) =

English cricketer

Personal information
- Full name: Hubert Francis Joseph Eaton
- Born: 16 January 1864; Westminster, London, England
- Died: 25 March 1910 (aged 46); Ketton, Rutland, England
- Batting: Right-handed
- Relatives: Charles Eaton (father); George Campbell (father-in-law)

Domestic team information
- Years: Team
- 1885: Cambridge University
- 1887–1894: Marylebone Cricket Club

Career statistics
Competition	First-class
Matches	8
Runs scored	173
Batting average	14.41
100s/50s	–/1
Top score	64*
Catches/stumpings	4/–
- Source: Cricinfo, 23 June 2019

Hubert Francis Joseph Eaton JP (19 January 1864 – 25 March 1910) was an English first-class cricketer.

== Early life ==
Eaton was born at Westminster in January 1864 to Charles Ormston Eaton and his wife, Elizabeth Jane Eaton. He was educated at The Oratory School, before going up to Trinity College, Cambridge.

== Career ==
While studying at Cambridge he made his debut in first-class cricket for C. I. Thornton's XI against Cambridge University at Fenner's in 1884. The following year he made his debut for Cambridge University, playing three first-class matches against C. I. Thornton's England XI, the Marylebone Cricket Club (MCC), and A. J. Webbe's XI. After graduating from Cambridge, he played four first-class matches for the MCC between 1887–1894. Across his eight first-class appearances, Eaton scored 173 runs at an average of 14.41, with a high score of 64 not out.

Outside of cricket he served in the British Army with the Northamptonshire Regiment, where he reached the rank of captain, as well as serving as a justice of the peace. He was Sheriff of Rutland in 1906.

== Personal life ==
He married Evelyn Mary Campbell, daughter of the cricketer George Campbell.

He died in March 1910 at Ketton, Rutland. He is commemorated by stained glass by Christopher Whall in the east window of All Saints' Church, Little Casterton.
