= Edward Twopeny =

Australian politician

Edward Nowell Twopeny (24 October 1854 – 17 February 1932) was an Australian politician who represented the South Australian House of Assembly multi-member seat of Newcastle from 1917 to 1918, representing the Liberal Union.

Twopeny was born at Little Casterton in England, the son of Nowell Twopeny, Archdeacon of Flinders. His family migrated to South Australia when he was six, and he was educated at St. Peter's College in Adelaide. At seventeen, he went to work on Coonatta Station, where he later became manager. In 1903, Twopeny purchased a property near Quorn. He was chairman of the District Council of Hammond for fifteen years, a District Council of Kanyaka councillor for over twenty years, and its chairman at the time of his death. He was a life member of the Quorn Jockey Club, chairman of the Quorn Agricultural Society, and a member of the Quorn High School and Quorn Institute committees.

He was the first district secretary of the Farmers and Producers Political Union upon its foundation, and when that merged into the Liberal Union in 1910, he became its first district secretary for Newcastle, also serving as president and secretary of its Quorn branch. He was elected to the House of Assembly at a 1917 by-election but was defeated at the 1918 state election. He had previously unsuccessfully contested the 1910 and 1912 election, and was again unsuccessful at the 1921 election.

Twopeny died at Quorn in 1932 after twelve months of indifferent health and was buried at Quorn Cemetery. He had married in 1880, and had eight children. Two sons fought in World War I; one was killed, while the other was awarded the Military Cross. Upon his death, the Quorn Mercury described Twopeny as the "Father of the District". His brother, Richard Twopeny, was a notable journalist, newspaper editor and newspaper owner in Australia and New Zealand.
