= Stamford Shakespeare Company =

Amateur theatre company

Stamford Shakespeare
- Formation: 1968
- Type: Theatre Company
- Purpose: Production of plays by Shakespeare and other playwrights.
- Official language: English
- Artistic Director: Jean Harley
- Website: stamfordshakespeare.co.uk

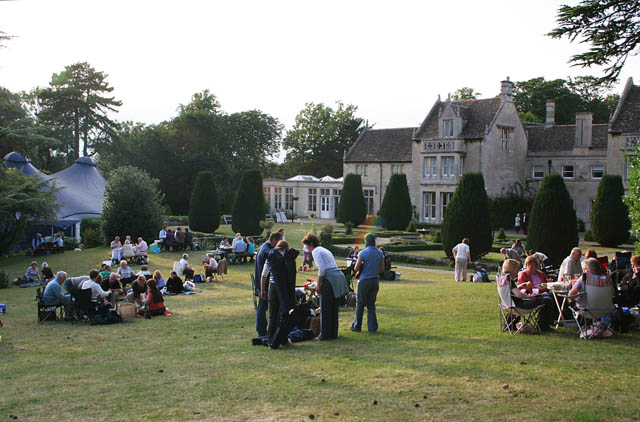
The grounds of Tolethorpe Hall; on the left the permanent canopy covering the auditorium

Stamford Shakespeare Company, a registered charity, is an amateur theatre company presenting an annual season of plays in June, July and August at the Rutland Open Air Theatre in the grounds of Tolethorpe Hall, Rutland.

== History ==
The amateur Stamford Shakespeare Company was founded in 1968 by the late Jean Harley, then Artistic Director, with a performance of A Midsummer Night's Dream in the Monastery Garden of the historic George Hotel in Stamford, Lincolnshire. It was under the support of the Stamford Arts Centre Committee in aid of the proposed new Arts Centre and restoration of the town's Georgian Theatre. In 1971, the theatre group became independent and was named the "Stamford Shakespeare Company".

Open-air Shakespeare plays continued at the George Hotel until 1976, when the hotel could no longer accommodate the summer open-air theatre because of building work. Tolethorpe Hall came on the market in a near derelict state early in 1977 and was acquired by the Stamford Shakespeare Company with a private loan later repaid. The main interest in the grounds was a natural amphitheatre which was converted into a concrete-stepped 600-seat auditorium covered by a canvas canopy. The first season opened in May 1977 with performances of Macbeth and The Taming of the Shrew.

The hall itself stands on the middle of three terraces cut in sloping ground. The raked auditorium looks outward across the lower terrace which forms the stage behind which, is the open country of the Gwash valley. The Stamford Shakespeare Company presents a three-month season each summer. Normally there are two Shakespeare plays and one by another playwright.

== 2014 season ==
- As You Like It
- Alice in Wonderland & Through the Looking Glass
- The Taming of the Shrew

== 2015 season ==
- Henry V
- Romeo and Juliet
- Tom Jones

== 2016 season ==
- Macbeth
- The Tempest
- The Wind in the Willows

== 2017 season ==
- Much Ado About Nothing
- A Midsummer Night's Dream
- Hobson's Choice

== 2018 season ==
- The Merchant of Venice
- The Merry Wives of Windsor
- The School for Scandal

== 2019 season ==
- Blithe Spirit
- Julius Caesar
- Twelfth Night

== 2020 season ==
- Love's Labour's Lost
- Romeo and Juliet
- The Importance of Being Earnest
- Lord of the Flies
