= Little Casterton =

Village in Rutland, England

Coordinates: 52.6785°N 0.4919°W

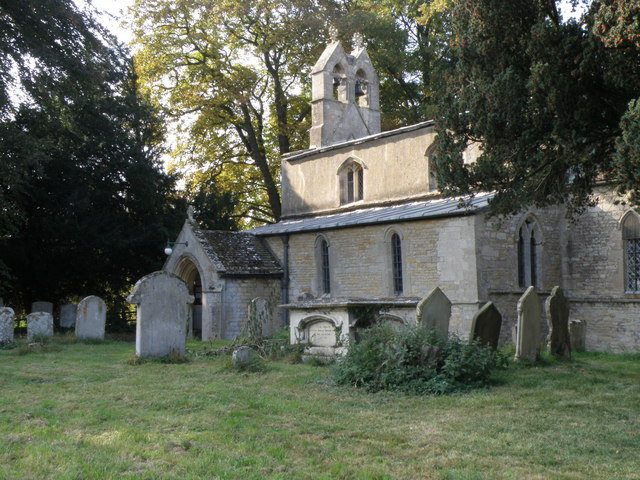
- All Saints' Church, Little Casterton

- Location within Rutland
- Area: 1.92 sq mi (5.0 km^{2})
- Population: 148 2001 census
  - Density: 77/sq mi (30/km^{2})
- OS grid reference: TF020100
  - London: 83 miles (134 km) SSE
- Unitary authority: Rutland
- Shire county: Rutland
- Ceremonial county: Rutland
- Region: East Midlands
- Country: England
- Sovereign state: United Kingdom
- Post town: STAMFORD
- Postcode district: PE9
- Dialling code: 01780
- Police: Leicestershire
- Fire: Leicestershire
- Ambulance: East Midlands
- UK Parliament: Rutland and Stamford

Little Casterton is a small village and civil parish in Rutland, England. The population of the civil parish at the 2001 census was 148, increasing to 218 at the 2011 census. It is about two miles (3 km) north of Stamford on a minor road that runs to the south of the River Gwash between Great Casterton and Ryhall.

The village's name means 'farm/settlement which was/near a Roman site'.

The parish church is dedicated to All Saints and is a Grade II* Listed Building. The east and west windows are by Christopher Whall and are in memory of former tenants of Tolethorpe Hall. The east window of 1911 depicts St Hubert, Christ in Majesty and St Francis and is in memory of Hubert Francis Christian Harrisson. The west window features St George and dates to 1919.

About half a mile to the north-east is Tolethorpe Hall, a 17th-century mansion. Since 1977, it has been used as the location of an open-air Shakespearean theatre, the Rutland Theatre of the Stamford Shakespeare Company.

The Little Casterton Working Weekend is held in the village each September. Veteran and vintage agricultural machinery is showcased in a working context. Combines, tractors and other equipment demonstrate harvesting, threshing, ploughing and other activities.

== The Rutland Dinosaur ==
In June 1968, the Rutland Dinosaur, a specimen of the sauropod dinosaur Cetiosaurus oxoniensis was found in the Williamson Cliffe quarry in the parish. It was calculated to be around 170 million years old, from the Aalenian or Bajocian part of the Jurassic period. It is one of the most complete dinosaur skeletons found in the UK, being fifteen metres long. Since 1975 the remains have been in Leicester Museum & Art Gallery.

== Notable people ==
Robert Browne (1550s – 1633), the founder of the Brownists, was born at Tolethorpe Hall.

A rector Thomas Nowell Twopeny was later the Archdeacon of Flinders in Australia. His sons, born in Little Casterton, Edward Nowell Twopeny and Richard Twopeny were prominent in Australia.
