= Richard Twopeny =

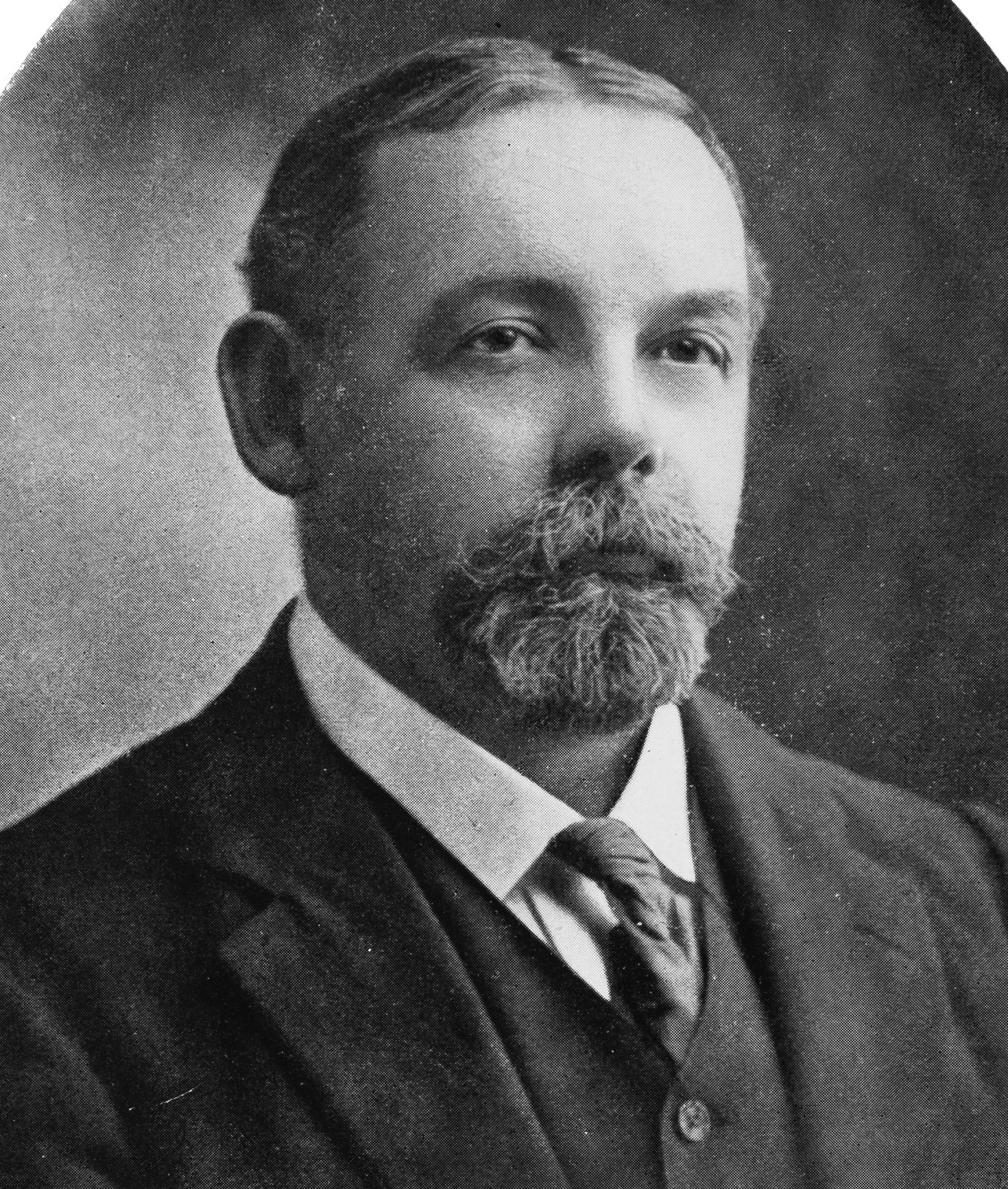

Personal information
- Full name: Richard Ernest Nowell Twopeny
- Born: 1 August 1857; Little Casterton, United Kingdom
- Died: 2 September 1915 (aged 58); London, United Kingdom
- Other occupation: Journalist

Playing career
| Years | Club | Games (Goals) |
| 1877 | Adelaide | 12 |

Richard Ernest Nowell Twopeny (1 August 1857 – 2 September 1915) was an Australian rules footballer, frequently spelled Twopenny or Tuppenny; also journalist and newspaper editor/owner in New Zealand and Australia, in which context he was invariably referred to as R. E. N. Twopeny.

== Early life ==
Twopeny was the son of Archdeacon T. Nowell Twopeny and Mathilde Twopeny of Adelaide. He was born in Little Casterton Rectory, Rutland, England in 1857. Edward Twopeny was a brother. Their father migrated to South Australia in 1860.

In 1872 Richard was a student at St Peter's College, Adelaide, and was captain of the school's football team. Twopeny spent part of his childhood in France and was educated at Marlborough College, England, until 1875 and the Ruprecht-Karl-Universität, Heidelberg, Germany.

Twopeny returned to Australia in 1876. He arrived in Melbourne on the Northumberland on 15 May 1876 and soon moved to Adelaide where he worked on the South Australian Register from 1876 to 1877.

== Australian rules football ==
=== South Australian Football Association (1877) ===
Richard Twopeny was a key member of organising and founding the South Australian Football Association in April 1877. Along with delegates from Adelaide, Port Adelaide, Willunga, South Park, North Adelaide, Kapunda, Bankers, Gawler, South Adelaide, Victorian, Woodville and Prince Alfred College the rules of the game in South Australia were set by the new Association delegates.

=== Adelaide Football Club (1877) ===
In 1877 Twopeny captained the club for 12 matches. He left the club at the end of 1877 to work in Melbourne.

== Town Life in Australia ==
Twopeny wrote a series of letters that would later be published as Town Life in Australia (1883). It compared the major cities of Australia—at the time Sydney, Melbourne and Adelaide—to each other and to those in the United Kingdom.

The book was hailed by the British Quarterly Review as a welcome change from the "sketches of bush life" that were commonly published about Australia in Britain at the time. The introduction to the 1973 reprint of the book says, "Twopeny reads as freshly today as he ever did."

== L'Australie Méridionale ==
As Twopeny studied in Paris, he could write in French; subsequently, he wrote L'Australie Meridionale about life in South Australia.

== Exhibition curator ==
Twopenny was secretary to the South Australian Commissions to the Paris, Sydney, and Melbourne Exhibitions of 1878, 1879, and 1880, respectively; one of the commissioners from New Zealand to the Melbourne Centennial Exhibition of 1888, and Executive Commissioner for the New Zealand and South Seas Exhibition in 1890.

== Journalism ==
Twopeny was editor of the Otago Daily Times from 1882 to 1890, is author of Town Life in Australia and of L'Australie Méridionale, and was the proprietor and editor of the Australian Pastoralists' Review, co-founded with Whitely King and A. W. Pearse in Melbourne in March 1891. He travelled to Europe in 1907; on returning to Melbourne in 1910, he wrote four articles for the Pastoralists' Review on his journey.

== Recognition ==
He was created an Officier d'Académie in 1879.

== Personal life ==
Twopenny was married to Mary Josephine, daughter of Rev. Albert Henry Wratislaw, vicar of Manorbier, Pembrokeshire, Wales. They married at St John's Anglican Church, Darlinghurst, Sydney, on 4 December 1879.

== Death ==
Twopeny died in London on 2 September 1915 of heart disease and pneumonia. He was survived by his wife; there were no children.
