= Nowell Twopeny =

Church of England priest

Reverend Nowell Twopeny
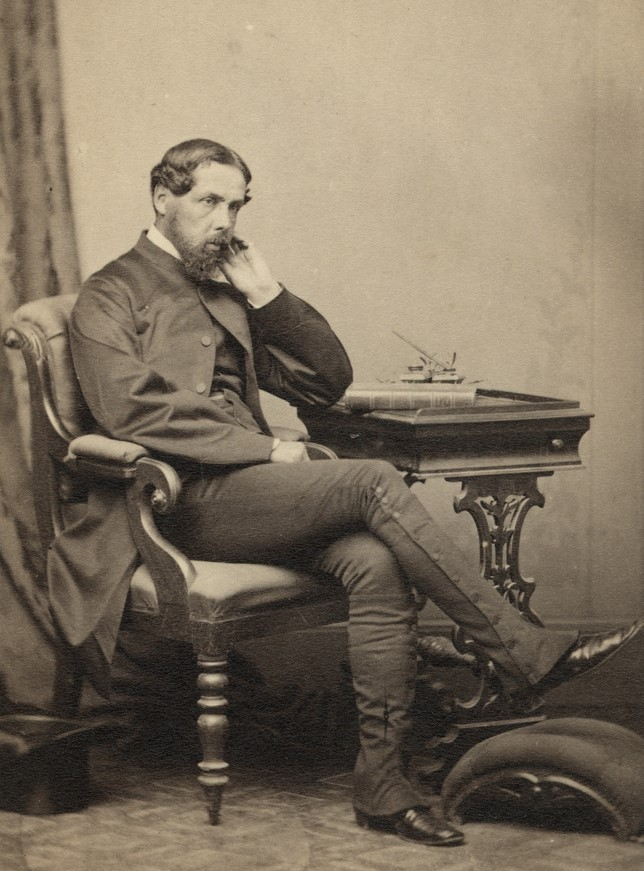
- Twopeny ca 1865
- Born: Thomas Nowell Twopeny; 6 February 1819
- Died: 3 November 1869 (aged 50)
- Education: Oriel College, Oxford
- Occupation: Anglican priest (ordained 1844)
- Known for: Archdeacon, Flinders, Australia
- Spouse: Mathilde Anaïse Louis (m.1851)
- Children: Edward Nowell Twopeny; Richard Ernest Nowell Twopeny
- Father: Thomas Nowell Twopenny

Thomas Nowell Twopeny or Twopenny (6 February 1819 – 3 November 1869) was a priest of the Church of England who was Archdeacon of Flinders in Australia.

He was the eldest son of Thomas Nowell Twopenny of East Knoyle, Wiltshire. He was educated at Uppingham School and Oriel College, Oxford and was ordained in 1844. He was Rector of Little Casterton, Rutland, from 1844 (succeeding his grandfather Rev. Richard Twopeny, rector 1781–1843), then in 1859 of South Weston, Oxfordshire, before going out to Australia with the Melrose mission in ca 1860.

Twopeny married Mathilde Anaïse Louis (or Lewis) on 22 October 1851, at St Matthew's Church, Jersey. His sons, born in Little Casterton, Edward Nowell Twopeny and Richard Ernest Nowell Twopeny were prominent in Australia.

A stained glass window by William Wailes was erected in his memory in the chapel of St Peter's College, Adelaide in 1872.
