= Tolethorpe Hall =

Country house near Stamford, Lincolnshire

Coordinates: 52.68165°N 0.48819°W

Tolethope Hall in the parish of Little Casterton, Rutland, England, PE9 4BH is a country house near Stamford, Lincolnshire at grid reference TF023104. It is now the location of the Rutland Theatre of the Stamford Shakespeare Company. The hall is a Grade II* Listed Building,

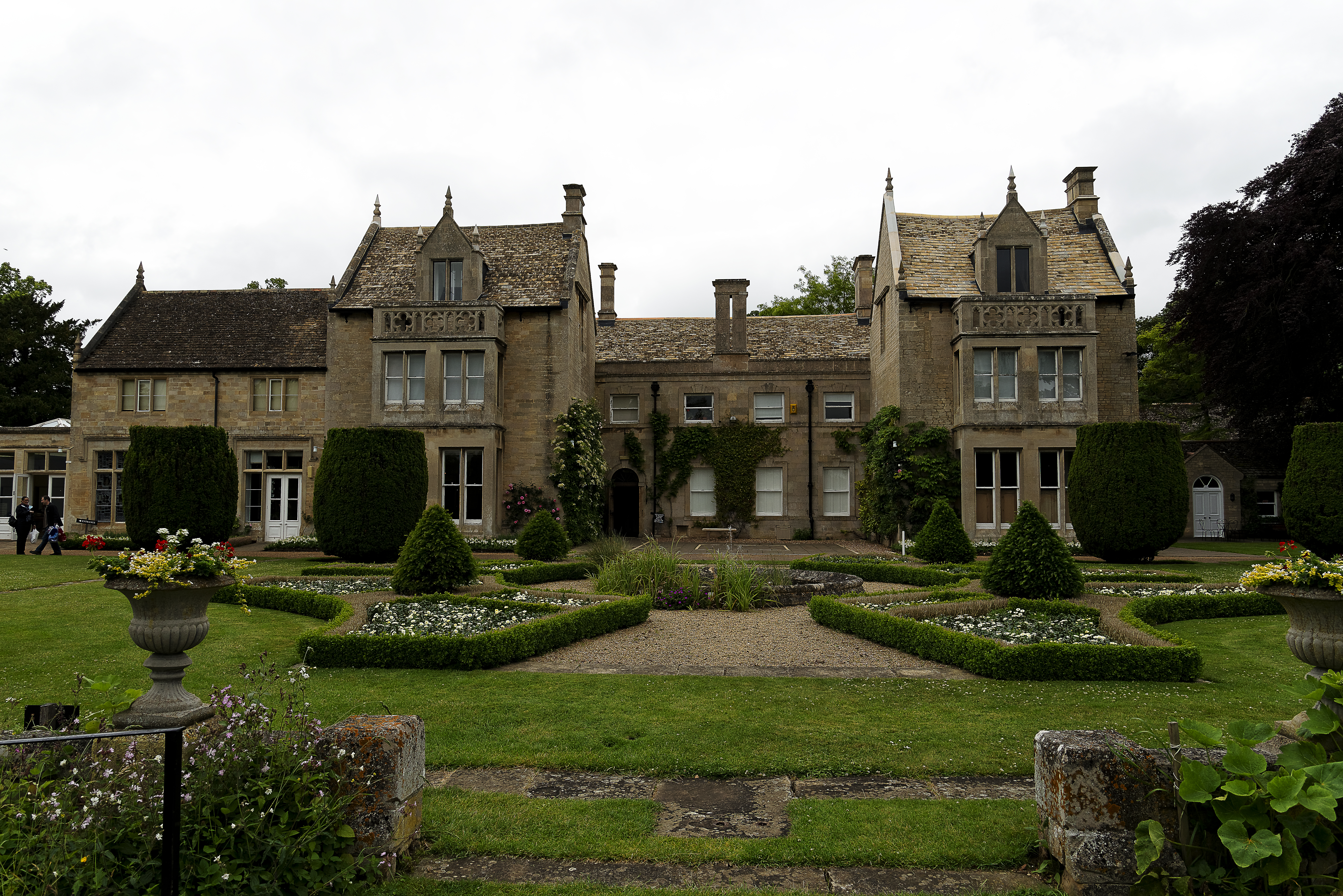
Tolethorpe Hall

From the A1 Great North Road, southbound, Tolethorpe Hall may be approached from the Old Great North Road (B1081) through the village of Little Casterton. It is about two miles (3 km) from the A1. The grounds of Tolethorpe occupy about seven acres.

== History ==
For 800 years from around 1088 until 1839 it was the home of three distinguished families, the de Tolethorpes (1088–1316), the Burtons (1316–1503) and the Brownes (1503–1839).

Sir Thomas Burton (c.1369–1438) was MP for Rutland three times and High Sheriff of Rutland three times.

Francis Browne was MP for Stamford and High Sheriff for 1524. His grandson Robert Browne (c. 1550 – 1633), born at Tolethorpe, became the leader of the Brownists, early advocates of a congregational form of organisation for the Church of England. Having in 1580 attempted to set up a separate church in Norwich, he moved to Middelburg in the Netherlands in 1581. He returned to England and to the Church of England, being employed as a schoolmaster and parish priest.

The estate was purchased in 1864 by Charles Ormston Eaton, of a Stamford banking family, who carried out a major reconstruction of the hall and formal gardens. He added a large wing on the east in the Jacobean style, and another smaller one on the west. The date 1867 appears on brackets of the rainwater heads. From the 1920s onwards, Tolethorpe Hall was rented by John Burnaby-Atkins, head of a landed gentry family of Halstead Place, Kent; his widow lived there until 1967, when the Eatons sold it to a Cambridgeshire farmer who sold it to Michael Racher in 1972 who, in 1977, sold the near derelict hall and a few acres of land to the Stamford Shakespeare Company.

The hall and its gardens are now noted as an outdoor Shakespearian theatre. The hall itself stands on the middle of three terraces cut in sloping ground. Its raked auditorium is arranged on the lower one, looking outward across the lower terrace which forms the open air stage behind which, is the open country of the Gwash Valley. The auditorium is permanently covered. The Stamford Shakespeare Company presents a three-month season each summer. Normally there are two Shakespeare plays and one by another playwright.

== See also ==
- Wilson v Racher [1974] ICR 428 a labour law case concerning the owner and gardener of the estate.
