= Puff Bar =

E-cigarette

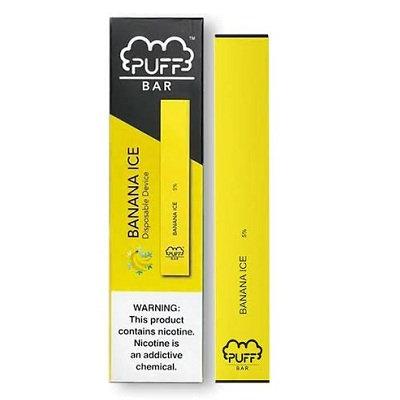

Puff Bar is a brand of disposable electronic cigarette. As of 2021, Puff Bar was the second most popular e-cigarette brand after Juul in the United States.

== Legal status in the United States ==
In response to a request from the United States House of Representatives, the US Food and Drug Administration (FDA) Center for Tobacco Products effectively banned sales of Puff Bar e-cigarettes in July 2020. Puff Bar returned to the market in February 2021 by claiming to switch to synthetic nicotine, which was not regulated by FDA Center for Tobacco Products at the time. As part of the Consolidated Appropriations Act, 2022, FDA was given authority over synthetic nicotine and required companies to submit their products for review within 30 days.

A 2022 national survey in the United States found that Puff Bar was the most popular brand of e-cigarette among youth. In October 2022, the FDA issued a warning letter to the makers of Puff Bar (EVO Brands LLC and PVG2, LLC) for receiving and delivering e-cigarettes in the US without an FDA marketing authorization order. FDA requested a response within 15 working days detailing how the companies intend to address the government's concerns.

== See also ==
- Environmental impact of disposable electronic cigarettes
- Regulation of electronic cigarettes
