= NJOY =

American electronic cigarette company

NJOY, LLC
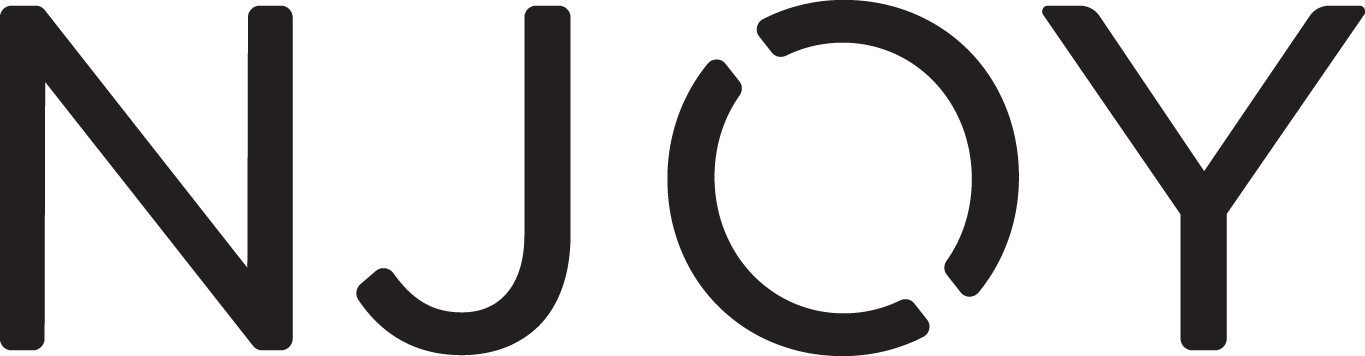
- Type: Subsidiary
- Industry: Electronic Cigarettes
- Founded: 2007; 19 years ago
- Headquarters: Scottsdale, Arizona, United States
- Key people: Shannon Leistra, Chief Executive Officer
- Parent: Altria Group (2023–present)
- Website: www.njoy.com

NJOY, LLC is an American company that manufactures and distributes electronic cigarettes and vaping products. The company has been wholly owned by Altria Group since 2023.

== History ==
NJOY, founded in 2007, was one of the first major e-cigarette brands in the US. It was founded by Arizona attorney Mark Weiss.

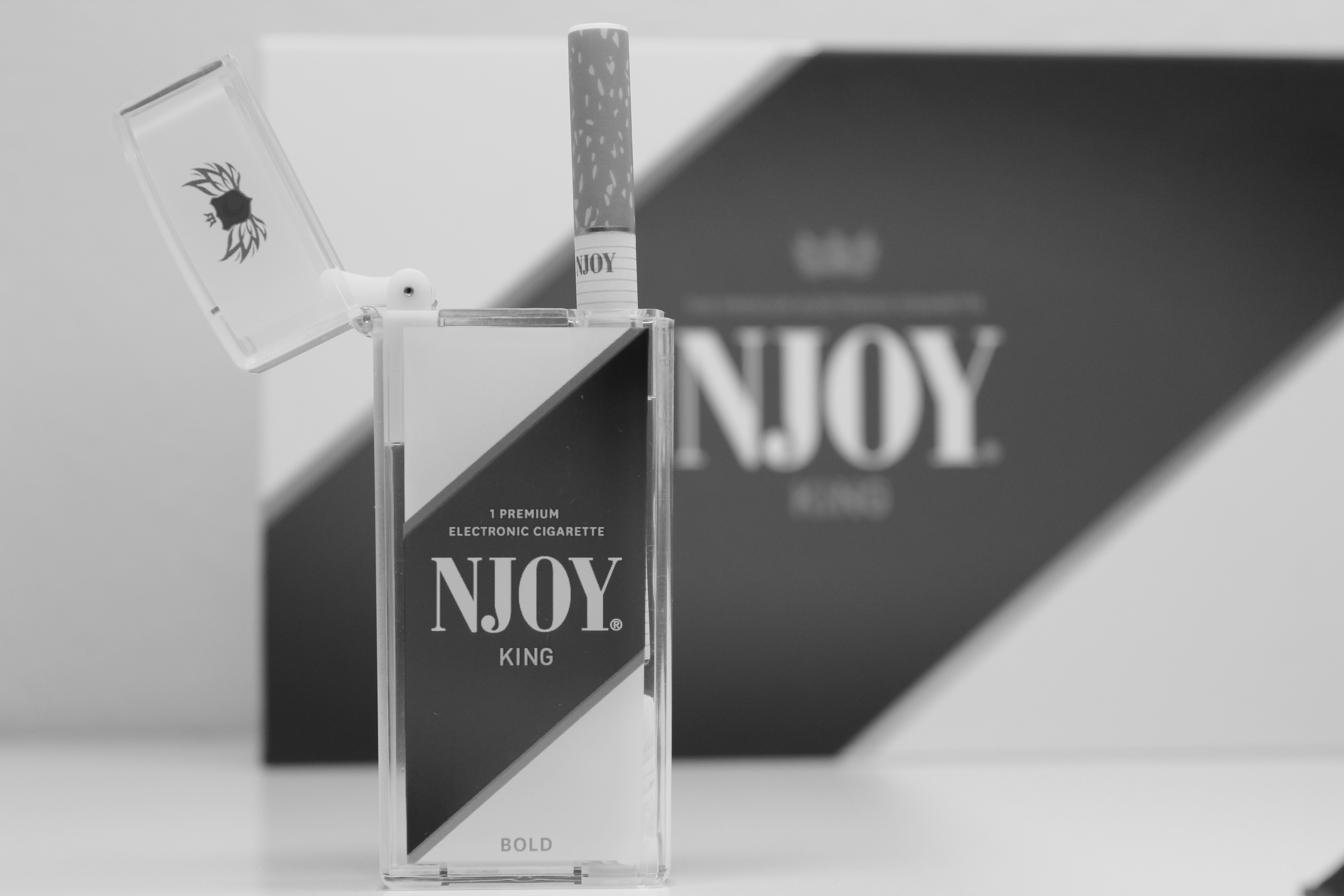
NJOY King

In 2010, the company won a landmark lawsuit against the Food and Drug Administration. The decision by the US Court of Appeals upheld a lower court ruling finding that the FDA lacked authority to regulate electronic cigarettes as drugs or medical devices, absent therapeutic claims. The court further held that FDA could seek to regulate electronic cigarettes via the FDA's authority under the Family Smoking Prevention and Tobacco Control Act of 2009, as argued by NJOY. In response, FDA announced that it would accept the Court of Appeals decision and would regulate the category under the Tobacco Control Act rather than under the agency's drug jurisdiction. The lawsuit thereby established the legal framework for the electronic cigarette/vaping industry.

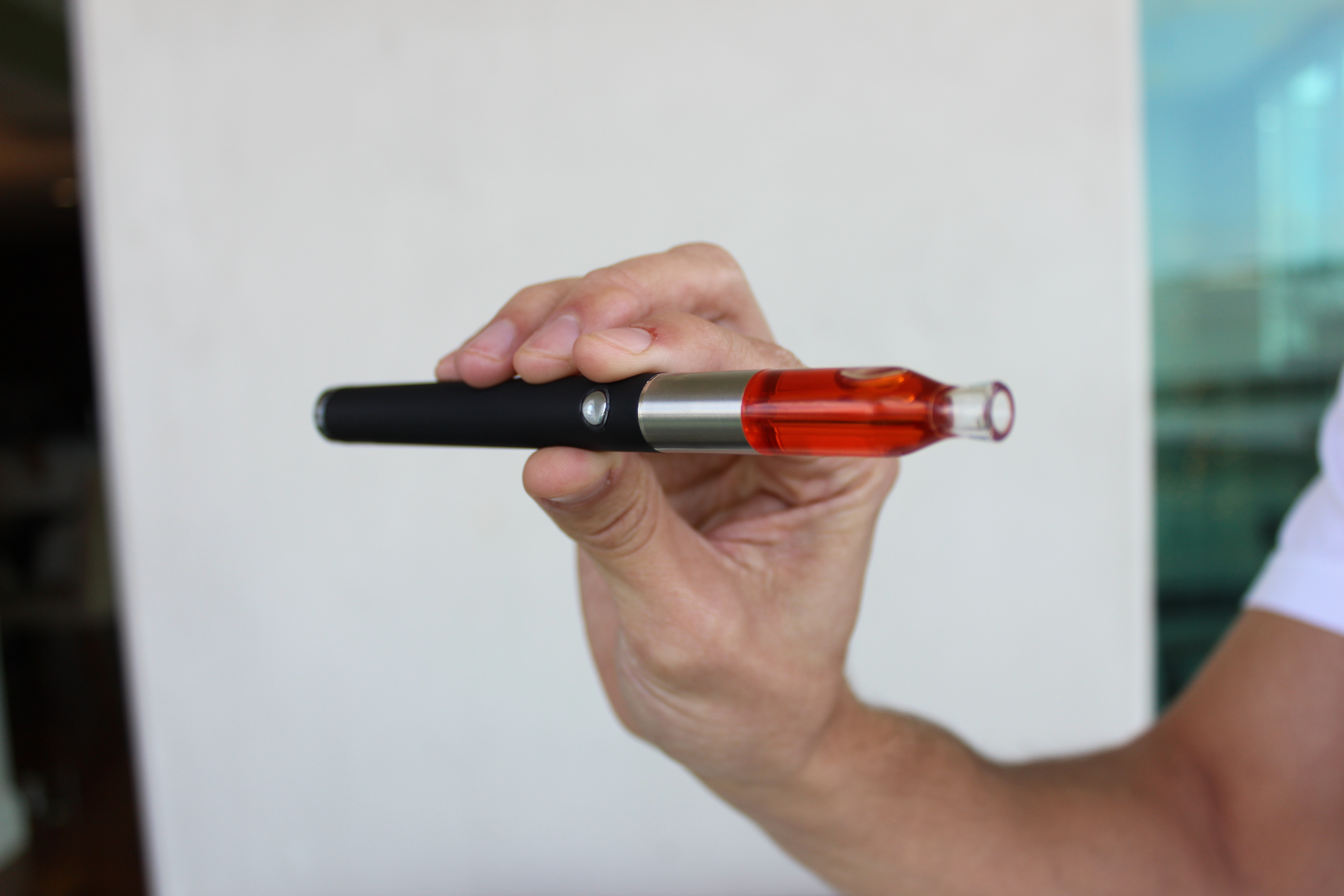
An NJOY device

Originally NJOY achieved commercial success following the resolution of its lawsuit with FDA. Much of this early success was due to well-received launch of the NJOY KING, a disposable electronic cigarette in a package and form factor that looks like a cigarette. The King was introduced in late 2012. Main product features included a white paper wrapping, a faux filter, and a red “ember” that lights when you draw. The King had no button to push and nothing to charge. The King became the best-selling e-cigarette in the United States and brought in $90 million in revenue in 2013. By 2014, NJOY was ranked number one by IRI in US vaping retail sales with over 90,000 points of distribution as well as 40,000 in Europe. Its closest rival was Blu as well as Vuse and MarkTen (by Altria).

The company's newer device, the NJOY King 2, did not find success and the increasing market competition led to NJOY filing for bankruptcy in September 2016. In 2017, NJOY, LLC acquired the assets of NJOY, Inc. and the company relaunched. NJOY's stated mission is to “make smoking history.” NJOY supplies e-cigarettes for independent, government-funded studies on smoking and e-cigarettes. The brand recovered in the following years.

In 2022, the FDA authorized several NJOY e-cigarette products to be legally marketed in the U.S.

On June 1, 2023, Altria Group acquired 100% control of NJOY, shortly after Altria sold its stake in Juul Labs.

== Products ==
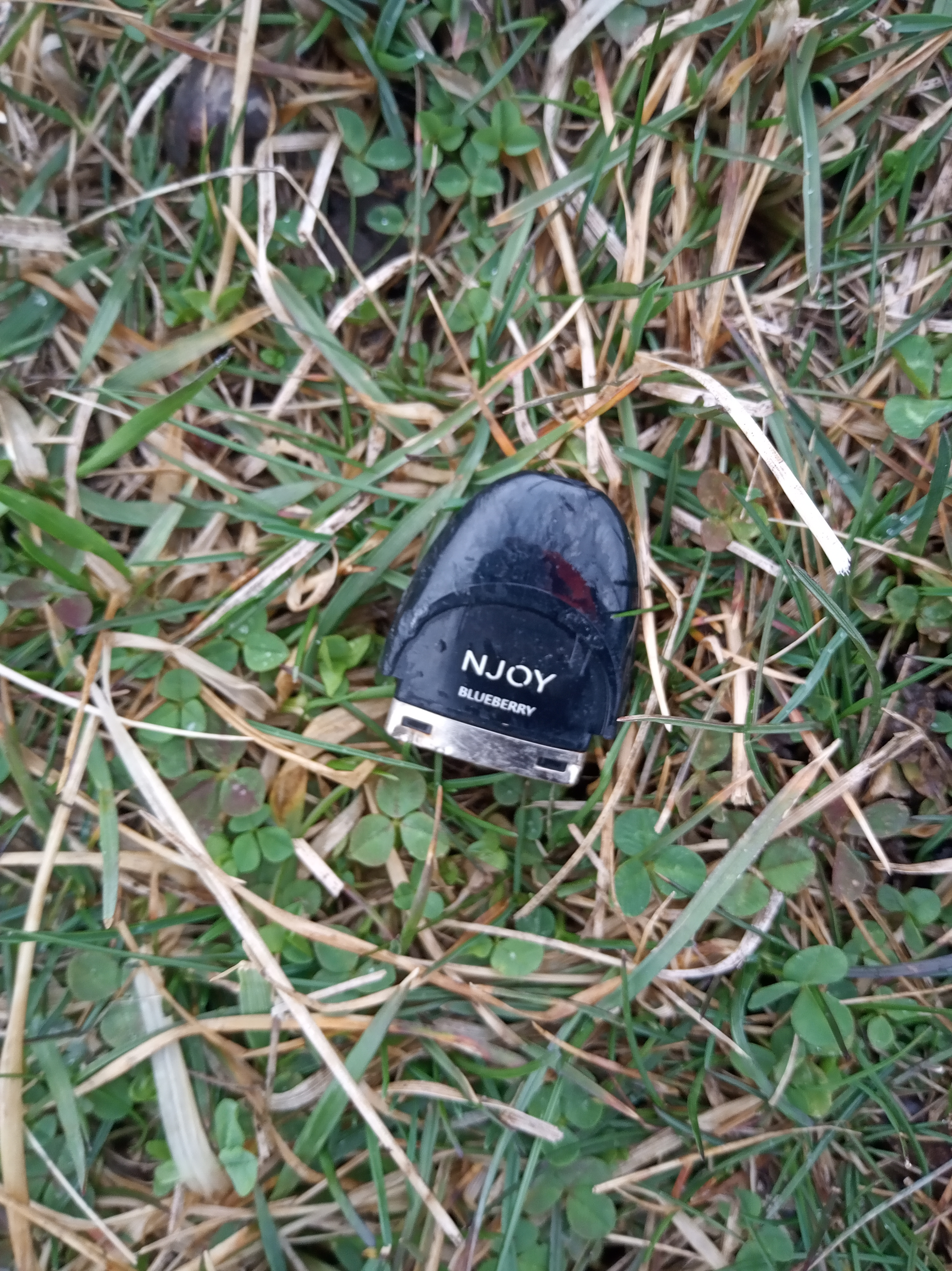
A Blueberry flavor NJOY prefilled pod

In the years following the King's launch, NJOY expanded its product offerings to include open system vape liquids, a closed system vape device called the PFT, a new disposable electronic cigarette called the DAILY, a rechargeable device called the LOOP, and a pod-based vape device called the ACE.

== People ==
The company's early individual investors include Sean Parker, Peter Thiel, Douglas Teitelbaum and Bruno Mars.

In 2013, former Surgeon General and physician Richard Carmona joined the company's Board of Directors, also serving in a scientific advisory role.

In 2015, NJOY named former Global President and General Manager of Pfizer's Consumer Health Care Business, Paul Sturman as CEO & President.

== See also ==
- Environmental impact of disposable electronic cigarettes
- Regulation of electronic cigarettes
