= Black & Mild =

Machine-made, pipe tobacco cigar

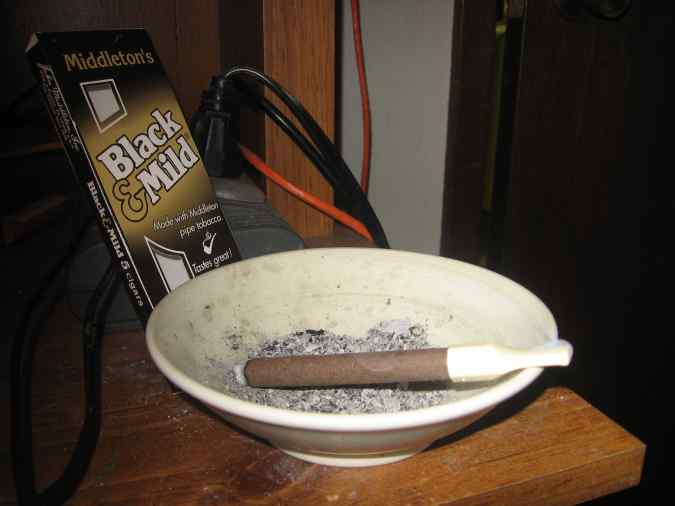
A plastic tipped Black & Mild in an ashtray, with package in background

Black & Mild is a machine-made pipe tobacco cigar made by tobacco company John Middleton Inc. In November 2007, Altria, the parent company of Philip Morris, purchased John Middleton, Inc.

Black & Milds are manufactured with a wrapper made from homogenized pipe tobacco, and sold with a plastic or wood tip. Other versions also include untipped and shorts, which are about half the size of original versions.

The company coined the slogan, "Tastes great! Smells great!", due to the sweet smell that the smoke produces.
