= Martin Barrington =

American businessman

- Born: Martin Joseph Barrington; July 16, 1953 (age 73); Albany, New York, U.S.
- Education: College of Saint Rose (BA); Albany Law School (JD)
- Board member of: Anheuser-Busch InBev; Virginia Museum of Fine Arts

Signature
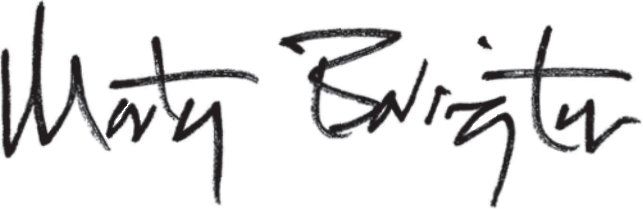

Martin Joseph "Marty" Barrington (born July 16, 1953) is an American businessman, who has been chairman and chief executive officer (CEO) of Altria Group, Inc, since May 2012 and its president since March 2015. Prior to his appointment as CEO, Barrington's previous positions at the company have included vice chairman, executive vice president and chief compliance and administrative officer. Barrington also serves on the board of Anheuser-Busch InBev.

== Career ==
Barrington has been employed continuously by the Altria Group and its subsidiaries in various capacities since 1993. Prior to joining the Altria Group, he practiced law in both the public and private sectors. Other public directorships include vice chairman of Altria Group; executive vice president and chief administrative officer of Altria Group; senior vice president and general counsel of Philip Morris International and senior vice president and general counsel of Philip Morris USA.

== Philanthropy ==
Barrington previously was on the board of commissioners of the Virginia Port Authority and the advisory board of Points of Light Institute. He is on the boards of trustees of the Virginia Museum of Fine Arts, and the board of directors of the Richmond Performing Arts Center.

== See also ==
- John Middleton Co.
- U.S. Smokeless Tobacco Company

Business positions
Preceded by Michael Szymanczyk	Chairman and CEO of Altria Group; 2012–2018	Succeeded by Howard A. Willard III
