= Prince Albert (tobacco) =

American tobacco brand

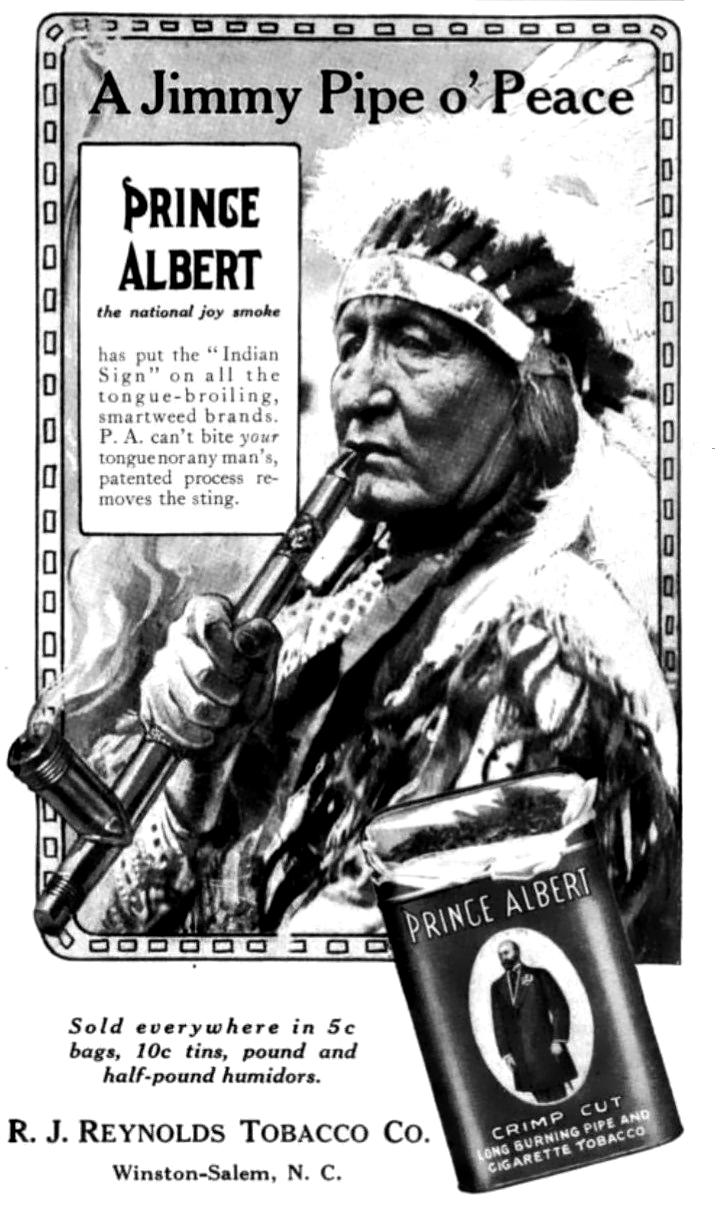
1913 advertisement for Prince Albert tobacco.

Prince Albert is an American brand of hand-rolled-cigarette and pipe tobacco, introduced by the R.J. Reynolds Tobacco Company in 1907. It has been owned since 1987 by John Middleton Inc.

== History ==
Prince Albert is one of the more popular independent brands of pipe tobacco in the United States; in the 1930s, it was the "second largest money-maker" for Reynolds. More recently, it has also become available in the form of pipe-tobacco cigars. (A 1960s experiment with filtered cigarettes was deemed a failure.) The blend is burley-based and remains one of America's top-selling pipe tobaccos.

The tobacco was named by R. J. Reynolds after Edward VII, who was known as Prince Albert before being crowned as the King of the United Kingdom. The portrait of Prince Albert was based on one acquired by Reynolds at a tea party with Mark Twain.

Prince Albert's cigars are available in packs of 5. Prince Albert's pipe tobacco is available in 1 1/2-ounce (43 g) pouches and 14-ounce (400 g) tins.

== Varieties ==
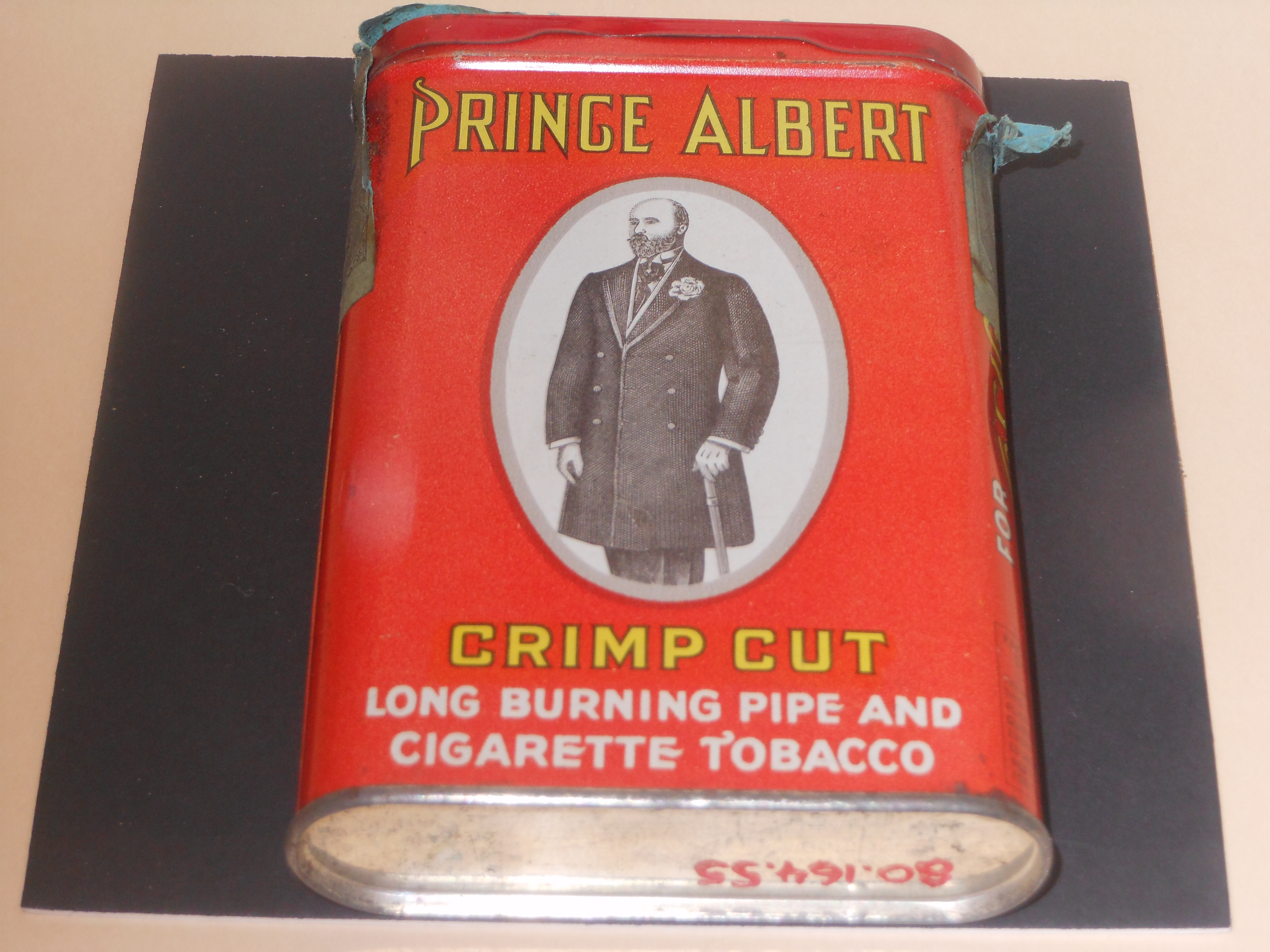
Classic Prince Albert Crimp Cut Tobacco

=== Cigars ===
- Prince Albert's Soft Cherry Vanilla
- Prince Albert's Soft & Sweet Vanilla

=== Pipe tobacco ===
- Prince Albert
- Prince Albert Crimp Cut
- Prince Albert Cherry Vanilla
- Prince Albert Soft Vanilla Cavendish
- Prince Albert Mellow

== "Prince Albert in a can" ==
The brand is the basis of a practical joke, usually made in the form of a prank call. The prankster typically calls a store and asks if they have "Prince Albert in a can". When the unsuspecting clerk responds, "yes" (because the tobacco is typically packaged in a can, though other forms of packaging also existed), the caller follows up with, "Well, you'd better let him out!" or something similar.

In 1974, season 1 Happy Days episode "The Deadly Dares" included Richie Cunningham performing the above prank call as part of a hazing initiation.

== Collectible vintage advertising tins ==
Prince Albert pocket tobacco tins are highly collectible vintage advertising items. Value varies based on the rarity, condition, and age of the tins. The design of the tins changed over time.

Other notable tin design variations include:

- A different push-up lid and on the bottom it's stamped in black ink, "PACKED EXPRESSLY FOR THE COMMISSARY DIVISION PANAMA RAILROAD COMPANY"
