= Regulation of electronic cigarettes =

Current legal status of e-cigarettes and nicotine-containing or nicotine-free cartridges in the world: Legal to sell nicotine-containing and nicotine-free cartridges Legal to sell nicotine-free and nicotine-containing cartridges below certain level Legal to sell nicotine-free cartridges; illegal to sell nicotine-containing cartridges (De facto) illegal to sell nicotine-containing and nicotine-free cartridges Unknown

Regulation of electronic cigarettes varies across countries and states, ranging from no regulation to banning them entirely. As of 2015, around two thirds of major nations have regulated e-cigarettes in some way. A 2023 report by the World Health Organization (WHO) found that 34 countries had banned the sale of e-cigarettes.

== Dynamics ==
Because of the potential relationship with tobacco control laws and medical drug policies, e-cigarette legislation is being debated in many countries. The companies that make e-cigarettes have been pushing for laws that support their interests. In 2016 the US Department of Transportation banned the use of e-cigarettes on commercial flights. This regulation applies to all flights to and from the US. In 2018, the Royal College of Physicians asked that a balance is found in regulations over e-cigarettes that ensure product safety while encouraging smokers to use them instead of tobacco, as well as keep an eye on any effects contrary to the control agencies for tobacco.

E-cigarettes were illegal in Japan, which forced the market to use heat-not-burn tobacco products for cigarette alternatives. Others have introduced strict restrictions and some have licensed devices as medicines such as in the UK. As of February 2018, there is no e-cigarette device that has been given a medical license that is commercially sold or available by prescription in the UK.

The legal status of e-cigarettes is currently pending in many countries. Many countries such as Brazil, Singapore, Uruguay, and India have banned e-cigarettes. Canada-wide in 2014, they were technically illegal to sell, as no nicotine-containing e-cigarettes are not regulated by Health Canada, but this is generally unenforced and they are commonly available for sale Canada-wide. In 2016, Health Canada announced plans to regulate vaping products. In the US and the UK, the use and sale to adults of e-cigarettes are legal.

The revised EU Tobacco Products Directive came into effect May 2016, providing stricter regulations for e-cigarettes. It limits e-cigarette advertising in print, on television and radio, along with reducing the level of nicotine in liquids and reducing the flavors used. It does not ban vaping in public places. It requires the purchaser for e-cigarettes to be at least 18 and does not permit buying them for anyone less than 18 years of age. The updated Tobacco Products Directive has been disputed by tobacco lobbyists whose businesses could be impacted by these revisions.

In August 2016, the FDA extended its regulatory power to include e-cigarettes, e-liquid and all related products. Under this ruling the FDA will evaluate certain issues, including ingredients, product features and health risks, as well their appeal to minors and non-users. The FDA rule also bans access to minors. A photo ID is now required to buy e-cigarettes, and their sale in all-ages vending machines is not permitted in the US. As of August 2017, regulatory compliance deadlines relating to premarket review requirements for most e-cigarette and e-liquid products have been extended from November 2017 to August 8, 2022, which attracted a lawsuit filed by the American Heart Association, American Academy of Pediatrics, the Campaign for Tobacco-Free Kids, and other plaintiffs.

In May 2016, the FDA used its authority under the Family Smoking Prevention and Tobacco Control Act to deem e-cigarette devices and e-liquids to be tobacco products, which meant it intended to regulate the marketing, labelling, and manufacture of devices and liquids; vape shops that mix e-liquids or make or modify devices were considered manufacturing sites that needed to register with FDA and comply with good manufacturing practice regulation. E-cigarette and tobacco companies have recruited lobbyists in an effort to prevent the FDA from evaluating e-cigarette products or banning existing products already on the market.

In February 2014 the European Parliament passed regulations requiring standardization and quality control for liquids and vaporizers, disclosure of ingredients in liquids, and child-proofing and tamper-proofing for liquid packaging. In April 2014 the FDA published proposed regulations for e-cigarettes. In the US some states tax e-cigarettes as tobacco products, and some state and regional governments have broadened their indoor smoking bans to include e-cigarettes. As of April 2017, 12 US states and 615 localities had prohibited the use of e-cigarettes in venues in which traditional cigarette smoking was prohibited. In 2015, at least 48 states and 2 territories had banned e-cigarette sales to minors.

E-cigarettes containing nicotine have been listed as drug delivery devices in a number of countries, and the marketing of such products has been restricted or put on hold until safety and efficacy clinical trials are conclusive. Since they do not contain tobacco, television advertising in the US is not restricted. Some countries have regulated e-cigarettes as a medical product even though they have not approved them as a smoking cessation aid. A 2014 review stated the emerging phenomenon of e-cigarettes has raised concerns in the health community, governments, and the general public and recommended that e-cigarettes should be regulated to protect consumers. It added, "heavy regulation by restricting access to e-cigarettes would just encourage continuing use of much unhealthier tobacco smoking." A 2014 review said regulation of the e-cigarette should be considered on the basis of reported adverse health effects.

Since 2025, a number of European countries include Belgium, France and the United Kingdom, have banned or are planning to ban the sale of disposable single-use e-cigarettes, mainly because of the littering aspect, concerns about being a fire risk and protecting against young people's health.

== Legal status by jurisdiction ==
The following table summarises the legal status of e-cigarettes and nicotine-containing or nicotine-free cartridges in jurisdictions worldwide. It can be sorted by region, country, or policy.

Region	Country	Administrative division	De jure					Notes
Region	Country	Administrative division	Legal status		Policy			Notes
Region	Country	Administrative division	Nicotine-containing cartridges	Nicotine-free cartridges	Purchase age	Smoking ban	Advertising	Notes
Africa	Algeria		legal	legal	unregulated	unregulated	unregulated	Currently there is no specific law regulating e-cigarettes.
Africa	Angola		legal	legal	unregulated	unregulated	unregulated	Currently there is no specific law regulating e-cigarettes.
Africa	Benin		legal	legal	unregulated	unregulated	unregulated	Currently there is no specific law regulating e-cigarettes.
Africa	Botswana		legal	legal	unregulated	unregulated	unregulated	The 2021 Tobacco Control Act does not specifically regulate e-cigarettes; their sale, use and advertising are not restricted.
Africa	Burundi		legal	legal	unregulated	unregulated	unregulated	Currently there is no specific law regulating e-cigarettes.
Africa	Cameroon		legal	legal	unregulated	unregulated	unregulated	Currently there is no specific law regulating e-cigarettes.
Africa	Cape Verde		legal	legal	18	applies	prohibited	
Africa	Central African Republic		legal	legal	unregulated	unregulated	unregulated	Currently there is no specific law regulating e-cigarettes.
Africa	Chad		legal	legal	unregulated	unregulated	unregulated	Currently there is no specific law regulating e-cigarettes.
Africa	Comoros		legal	legal	unregulated	unregulated	unregulated	Currently there is no specific law regulating e-cigarettes.
Africa	Democratic Republic of the Congo		legal	legal	unregulated	unregulated	unregulated	Currently there is no specific law regulating e-cigarettes.
Africa	Djibouti		legal	legal	unregulated	unregulated	unregulated	Currently there is no specific law regulating e-cigarettes.
Africa	Egypt		legal	legal	18	applies	restricted	
Africa	Equatorial Guinea		legal	legal	unregulated	unregulated	unregulated	Currently there is no specific law regulating e-cigarettes.
Africa	Eritrea		legal	legal	unregulated	unregulated	unregulated	Currently there is no specific law regulating e-cigarettes.
Africa	Eswatini		legal	legal	unregulated	unregulated	unregulated	Currently there is no specific law regulating e-cigarettes.
Africa	Ethiopia		banned	banned	unregulated	unregulated	unregulated	
Africa	Gabon		banned	banned	unregulated	unregulated	unregulated	Vaping is banned, though it is unclear whether the ban applies only to the sale of e-cigarettes or also to personal use.
Africa	Gambia		banned	banned	unregulated	unregulated	unregulated	
Africa	Ghana		only with prescription	only with prescription	18	applies	prohibited	In July 2023 Ghana's Food and Drug Administration (FDA) outlawed the recreational use of e-cigarettes. From now on a medical prescription will be required to buy e-cigarettes with and without nicotine.
Africa	Guinea-Bissau		legal	legal	unregulated	unregulated	unregulated	Currently there is no specific law regulating e-cigarettes.
Africa	Kenya		legal	legal	18	unregulated	unregulated	Currently there is no specific law regulating e-cigarettes.
Africa	Lesotho		legal	legal	unregulated	unregulated	unregulated	Currently there is no specific law regulating e-cigarettes.
Africa	Liberia		legal	legal	unregulated	unregulated	unregulated	Currently there is no specific law regulating e-cigarettes.
Africa	Libya		legal	legal	unregulated	unregulated	unregulated	Currently there is no specific law regulating e-cigarettes.
Africa	Malawi		legal	legal	unregulated	unregulated	unregulated	Currently there is no specific law regulating e-cigarettes.
Africa	Mauritania		legal	legal	unregulated	unregulated	unregulated	Currently there is no specific law regulating e-cigarettes.
Africa	Mauritius		banned	banned	unregulated	unregulated	prohibited	The manufacture, import, distribution, sale and offer for sale of e-cigarettes, including e-liquids and devices, is banned, as is their advertising and marketing.
Africa	Morocco		legal	legal	unregulated	unregulated	unregulated	So far e-cigarattes and liquids with and without nicotine are not regulated in Marocco. Since most products are imported from the European market the nicotin content is limited to 20 mg/ml.
Africa	Mozambique		legal	legal	unregulated	unregulated	unregulated	Currently there is no specific law regulating e-cigarettes.
Africa	Namibia		legal	legal	unregulated	unregulated	unregulated	Currently there is no specific law regulating e-cigarettes.
Africa	Niger		legal	legal	unregulated	unregulated	unregulated	Currently there is no specific law regulating e-cigarettes.
Africa	Nigeria		legal	legal	unregulated	unregulated	unregulated	Currently there is no specific law regulating e-cigarettes.
Africa	Republic of the Congo		legal	legal	18	applies	prohibited	E-cigarettes are regulated: sale to those under 18 is prohibited, use is banned in indoor public places, workplaces and public transport, and advertising is banned.
Africa	Rwanda		legal	legal	unregulated	unregulated	unregulated	Currently there is no specific law regulating e-cigarettes.
Africa	Senegal		legal	legal	18	applies	prohibited	
Africa	Seychelles		banned	banned	unregulated	applies	prohibited	
Africa	Somalia		legal	legal	unregulated	unregulated	unregulated	Currently there is no specific law regulating e-cigarettes.
Africa	South Africa		only with prescription	legal	unregulated	unregulated	unregulated	E-cigarettes containing nicotine have been categorized by the South African Medicines Control Council as a scheduled drug, specifically falling under Schedule 3 of the Medicines and Related Substances Act. As per the provisions of this act, substances listed under Schedule 3 can only be sold in pharmacies and require a prescription for purchase.
Africa	South Sudan		legal	legal	unregulated	unregulated	unregulated	Currently there is no specific law regulating e-cigarettes.
Africa	Sudan		legal	legal	unregulated	unregulated	unregulated	Currently there is no specific law regulating e-cigarettes.
Africa	Tanzania		legal	legal	unregulated	unregulated	unregulated	Currently there is no specific law regulating e-cigarettes. There is a proposal to outlaw the importation, sale and consumption of e-cigarettes and shisha.
Africa	Togo		legal	legal	18	applies	prohibited	
Africa	Tunisia		legal	legal	18	applies	restricted	
Africa	Uganda		banned	banned	unregulated	unregulated	unregulated	Under the provisions of the Tobacco Control Act of 2015, e-cigarettes are categorized as electronic nicotine delivery systems. The Act strictly prohibits the sale, offering for sale, distribution, importation, manufacturing, and processing of both nicotine-containing and non-nicotine e-cigarettes. Furthermore, the Act prohibits the entry of e-cigarettes into the country.
Africa	Western Sahara		unknown	unknown	unknown	unknown	unknown	
Africa	Zambia		legal	legal	unregulated	unregulated	unregulated	Currently there is no specific law regulating e-cigarettes.
Africa	Zimbabwe		legal	legal	unregulated	unregulated	unregulated	Currently there is no specific law regulating e-cigarettes.
Asia	Afghanistan		legal	legal	unregulated	unregulated	unregulated	Currently there is no specific law regulating e-cigarettes.
Asia	Armenia		below 20 mg/ml legal	legal	18	applies	prohibited	
Asia	Azerbaijan		legal	legal	18	applies	prohibited	
Asia	Bahrain		legal	legal	18	applies	restricted	The country recently allowed the import of e-cigarettes and taxes them like tobacco products.
Asia	Bangladesh		banned	banned	none	applies	prohibited	Sale, import, and use of e-cigarettes are prohibited. Strict enforcement; black market exists
Asia	Bhutan		banned	banned	18	applies	restricted	In 2004, Bhutan implemented a ban on the production and sale of tobacco and tobacco-related products, which encompassed e-cigarettes as well. However, individuals are allowed to bring e-cigarette products into the country for personal use, with the condition that import duties are paid and carriers can provide evidence of taxation.
Asia	Brunei		banned	banned	18	applies	unregulated	Categorized as products imitating tobacco, items that imitate tobacco products are restricted by the Tobacco Order, which prohibits their sale, offer for sale, or importation. Furthermore, their usage is not allowed in specific public locations and on public transportation, as outlined in the Tobacco Order. Additionally, preparations containing nicotine levels exceeding 7.5 percent are classified as poisons. According to the Poisons Act, individuals must obtain a license or permit from the Pharmacy Enforcement Unit of the Ministry of Health to import, possess for sale, or offer for sale any such poison.
Asia	Cambodia		banned	banned	18	applies	unregulated	
Asia	China	China (mainland)	below 20 mg/ml legal	banned	18	applies	restricted	Only tobacco flavor permitted. Ban on flavors does not apply to export products.
Asia	China	Hong Kong	banned	banned	18	applies	restricted	Alternative smoking products ("ASPs") are defined under Part 2 of Schedule 7 to the Smoking (Public Health) Ordinance (Cap. 371). Import, promotion, manufacture, sale or possession for commercial purposes of ASPs is banned and punishable to a fine of HK$50,000 and imprisonment for 6 months.
Asia	China	Macau	banned	banned	18	applies	restricted	The sale of e-cigarettes in Macau was banned starting in January 2018. Law No. 13/2022, amending Law No. 5/2011 on the smoking prevention and control regime, prohibits the manufacture, distribution, sale, import, and export of electronic cigarettes and tobacco products intended for oral use or to be inhaled. A fine of MOP$4,000 is imposed for any offender.
Asia	East Timor		banned	banned	unregulated	unregluated	unregulated	
Asia	India		banned	banned	unregulated	unregluated	prohibited	On 18 September 2019, the Government of India imposed a ban on sale and production of e-cigarettes. Importing e-cigarettes is also illegal in India. (Note: In India, E-cigarettes are mostly unregulated and are technically illegal to sell, as they have not received approval from the Central Drugs Standard Control Organization (CDSCO). According to government data, as of July 2019, there were over 460 e-cigarette brands available in the Indian market utilizing varying methods of nicotine delivery and over 7,700 flavours of e-liquids. The Ministry of Health and Family Welfare issued an advisory to restrict the advertisement of e-cigarettes in August 2018. The CDSCO notified all state drug controllers on 22 February 2019 that ENDS products were not approved for sale, and asked them to ensure that the sale of such products was prohibited. There was confusion over what law could be applied to regulate e-cigarettes. On 1 June 2019, experts at a drug consultative committee meeting concluded that ENDS devices fell under the definition of "drug" under Section 3(b) of the Drugs and Cosmetics Act, 1940. The State Drugs Controller of the state of Punjab declared e-cigarettes with nicotine as an unapproved drug in 2013. On 7 April 2016, a District Court in the Punjab sentenced a man to 3 years imprisonment and a fine of ₹1 lakh (US$1,000) for selling e-cigarettes. This was the first ever conviction in India concerning e-cigarettes. The states of Bihar, Haryana, Karnataka, Kerala, Jammu and Kashmir, Maharashtra, Mizoram, Punjab, Uttar Pradesh and the union territory of Chandigarh have declared e-cigarettes as an unapproved drug under the Drugs and Cosmetics Act and Rules, 1945, and can prosecute sellers under the Drugs and Cosmetics Act and Rules, 1945.)
Asia	Indonesia		legal	legal	unregulated	unregluated	unregulated	From 1 July 2018, Indonesian Government starting to impose 57% tax on e-liquid, but then postponed until 1 October. Indonesian Government estimates the contribution from the tax would contribute around 100-200 billion rupiah. The tax is based on Finance Ministerial Regulation No. 146/010/2017 on tobacco.
Asia	Iran		banned	banned	unregulated	applies	unregulated	
Asia	Iraq		banned	banned	unregulated	unregulated	prohibited	
Asia	Israel		below 20 mg/ml legal	legal	18	applies	restricted	In 2013, the Ministry of Health planned to extend existing laws on smoking in public places to e-cigarettes, a year after warning against the product's usage.
Asia	Japan		de facto ban	legal	unregulated	unregulated	unregulated	E-cigarettes containing nicotine were banned starting in 2010. Non-nicotine e-cigarettes are sold to adults and minors since no regulation exists for non-nicotine e-cigarettes in Japan. While it is legal if the e-cigarette is registered as a medicinal product so far there have been no approved medicinal e-cigarettes. However, the Ministry of Health, Labor and Welfare has released a statement allowing the private importation of medicinal e-cigarettes, under the condition that it is strictly for personal use and the quantity imported is less than a one-month supply.
Asia	Jordan		below 20 mg/ml legal	legal	19	applies	restricted	Flavors must be food grade.
Asia	Kazakhstan		banned	banned	N/A (sale banned)	applies	restricted	The sale, import, manufacture and distribution of e-cigarettes, including e-liquids and devices, are banned.
Asia	Kuwait		legal	legal	21	unregulated	unregulated	In 2016, the sale, importation and usage of e-cigarettes was made legal.
Asia	Kyrgyzstan		banned	banned	N/A (sale banned)	applies	prohibited	The importation, circulation and use of e-cigarettes are prohibited under Law No. 121 (2021), as amended in 2024.
Asia	Lebanon		banned	banned	unregulated	applies	prohibited	
Asia	Malaysia	Malaysia	only with prescription	legal	none (without nicotine); 18 (with nicotine)	applies	prohibited	In 2015, the Malaysian National Fatwa Council issued a fatwa declaring e-cigarettes haram (forbidden) because of their harmful health effects and bad smell. Though the fatwa is not legally binding, it carries weight for religious Muslims and has caused the governments of four states—Penang, Kedah, Johor, and Kelantan—to ban vaping. As a response to the fatwa, the Malaysian federal government began regulating e-liquid ingredients and vape sales to minors in 2018, marking the first federal regulations of the 2.5 billion ringgit (US$610 million) industry. A petition called "Selamatkan anak-anak Malaysia" was launched by Parent & Teacher Action Group Malaysia to urge government to ban (totally) e-cigarette and vape in Malaysia, which they managed to collect more than 100,000 signatures so far. Only licensed pharmacies or registered medical practitioners are authorized to sell e-cigarettes containing nicotine. Effective January 1, 2021, e-liquids will be subjected to a 10% ad valorem excise tax and an excise duty of 40 cents per milliliter of liquid.
Asia	Malaysia	Penang; Kedah; Johor; Kelantan	banned	banned	none (without nicotine); 18 (with nicotine)	applies	prohibited	
Asia	Maldives		banned	banned	18	applies	prohibited	
Asia	Mongolia		legal	legal	18	unregulated	unregulated	Effective February 8, 2024, a law was passed to put age restriction on buying e-cigarettes.
Asia	Myanmar		unknown	unknown	unknown	unknown	unknown	
Asia	Nepal		legal	legal	unregulated	applies	prohibited	Single use e-cigarettes are prohibited.
Asia	North Korea		banned	banned	unknown	unknown	unknown	
Asia	Oman		banned	banned	unknown	unknown	unknown	
Asia	Pakistan		legal	legal	unregulated	unregulated	unregulated	So far there are now laws regulating e-cigarettes.
Asia	Palestine		banned	banned	unregulated	unregulated	unregulated	Sale, import, and use of e-cigarettes are prohibited. Strict enforcement; black market exists.
Asia	Philippines		legal	legal	21	applies	prohibited	All flavors except for plain tobacco and plain menthol are prohibited.
Asia	Qatar		banned	banned	unregulated	unregulated	unregulated	E-cigarettes have been illegal since 2014.
Asia	Saudi Arabia		below 20 mg/ml legal	legal	18	applies	permitted	Certain flavors of e-cigarettes, such as cocoa, vanilla, coffee, tea, spices, candy, chewing gum, cola, and alcohol, are prohibited by law. The only permissible flavors are fruit flavors, menthol, or a combination of these.
Asia	Singapore		banned	banned	unregulated	applies	prohibited	E-cigarettes are currently prohibited under Section 16 (1) of the Tobacco (Control of Advertisements and Sale) Act, which is enforced by the Health Sciences Authority (HSA). This legislation prohibits the importation, distribution, sale or offer for sale of any confectionery or other food product or any toy or other article that is designed to resemble a tobacco product or the packaging of which is designed to resemble the packaging commonly associated with tobacco products. HSA takes a serious view on any person who contravenes the law. Those guilty of the offence are liable to a fine of up to $5,000 upon conviction. According to Health Minister Khaw Boon Wan, e-cigarettes are the industry's attempt to attract new users and were marketed to appeal to younger customers, including women.
Asia	South Korea		legal	legal	19	applies	restricted	The sale and use of e-cigarettes is legal, but is heavily taxed. Electric cigarette possession among teenagers remains an issue.
Asia	Sri Lanka		banned	banned	unregulated	unregulated	unregulated	
Asia	Syria		banned	banned	unregulated	applies	prohibited	
Asia	Taiwan		banned	banned	unregulated	applies	prohibited	The sale and import of e-cigarettes is illegal in the Taiwan area. Passengers are not allowed to carry e-cigarettes and e-liquids into Taiwan. Failure to do so will result in a fine of up to NT$50 million.
Asia	Tajikistan		legal	legal	18	applies	unregulated	
Asia	Thailand		banned	banned	unregulated	uncertain	unregulated	Thailand has banned e-cigarettes since 2014.
Asia	Turkmenistan		banned	banned	unregulated	uncertain	prohibited	
Asia	United Arab Emirates		below 20 mg/ml legal	legal	18	unregulated	prohibited	The sale and use of e-cigarettes has become legal from 15 April 2019. Cinnamon flavored products are prohibited.
Asia	Uzbekistan		banned	banned	N/A (sale banned)	applies	prohibited	On 27 November 2025, a law imposed a complete ban on the circulation, import and sale of e-cigarettes and e-liquids, with criminal penalties; heated tobacco products are not covered.
Asia	Vietnam		banned	banned	unregulated	applies	prohibited	The National Assembly agreed to ban the production, sale, import, storage, transportation and usage of e-cigarettes starting 2025 to protect people's health.
Asia	Yemen		legal	legal	18	unregulated	unregulated	Currently there are no laws regulating e-cigarettes.
Oceania	Australia		legal only at pharmacies without prescription for above 18 and below 20 mg/mL	legal only at pharmacies without prescription for above 18	18 for nicotine-containing cartridges	applies	prohibited	The Therapeutic Goods Administration (TGA) classifies, on the Poisons Standard, nicotine therapeutic vaping products as either pharmacist only medicines or prescription only medicines. From 1 July 2024, all e-cigarettes (vapes) and vaping products can only be sold in a pharmacy. The importation of disposable vapes is banned and all other vaping goods require an import licence or permit. Flavours for vapes are restricted to mint, menthol, and tobacco. Packaging must follow the plain pharmaceutical packaging standards. Therapeutic vapes with a nicotine concentration of 20 mg/mL or less are available from a pharmacy to anyone 18 years or older subject to a pharmacists approval. Therapeutic vapes with a nicotine concentration greater than 20 mg/mL or for anyone under 18 require a prescription. Australia is developing regulations on e-cigarettes. Laws vary across Australia's states and can conflict. In April 2014 a court decision made it illegal to sell or supply e-cigarettes regardless of their appearance or nicotine content (even if zero) in Western Australia. Previously they were banned if they looked like cigarettes. The court ruled that the action they provided in and of itself looks like cigarettes.
Oceania	Fiji		legal	legal	18	applies	prohibited	
Oceania	Micronesia, Federated States of	Chuuk	unknown	unknown	unknown	unknown	unknown	
Oceania	Micronesia, Federated States of	Kosrae	unknown	unknown	unknown	unknown	unknown	
Oceania	Micronesia, Federated States of	Pohnpei	unknown	unknown	unknown	unknown	unknown	
Oceania	Micronesia, Federated States of	Yap	unknown	unknown	unknown	unknown	unknown	
Oceania	New Zealand		below 20 mg/ml legal	legal	18	applies	prohibited	General retailers are restricted by law from selling e-cigarettes featuring flavors other than tobacco, mint, or menthol. On the other hand, specialist e-cigarette retailers that have obtained approval have the freedom to sell e-cigarette products in any flavor that has not been prohibited. As of now, there are no prohibited flavors, meaning that approved specialist e-cigarette retailers are permitted to sell e-cigarettes in any flavor they choose.
Oceania	Palau		legal	legal	21	applies	prohibited	
Oceania	Papua New Guinea		legal	legal	18	applies	prohibited	
Oceania	Samoa		unknown	unknown	unknown	unknown	unknown	
Oceania	Solomon Islands		unknown	unknown	unknown	unknown	unknown	
Oceania	Tonga		unknown	unknown	unknown	unknown	unknown	
Oceania	United States	American Samoa	unknown	unknown	unknown	unknown	unknown	
Oceania	United States	Guam	legal	legal	21	applies	prohibited	Proposal to prohibit liquids with characteristic flavors and tastes.
Oceania	United States	Northern Mariana Islands	legal	legal	21	applies	prohibited	
Oceania	Vanuatu		unknown	unknown	unknown	unknown	unknown	
Europe	Albania		below 20 mg/ml legal	legal	18	applies	prohibited	
Europe	Andorra		unknown	unknown	unknown	unknown	unknown	
Europe	Austria		below 20 mg/ml legal	legal	18	applies	prohibited	
Europe	Belarus		legal	legal	18	applies	restricted	
Europe	Belgium		below 20 mg/ml legal	legal	18	applies	prohibited	Since 1 January 2025, disposable e-cigarettes are illegal.
Europe	Bosnia and Herzegovina		below 20 mg/ml legal	legal	18	unknown	unknown	
Europe	Bulgaria		below 20 mg/ml legal	legal	18	applies	prohibited	
Europe	Croatia		below 20 mg/ml legal	legal	18	applies	restricted	
Europe	Cyprus		below 20 mg/ml legal	legal	18	applies	restricted	
Europe	Czech Republic		below 20 mg/ml legal	legal	none	does not apply	not regulated	
Europe	Denmark		below 20 mg/ml legal	legal	18	applies	prohibited	Only menthol and tobacco flavor permitted.
Europe	Estonia		below 20 mg/ml legal	legal	18	applies	restricted	Only menthol and tobacco flavor permitted.
Europe	Finland		below 20 mg/ml legal	legal	18	applies	restricted	Only tobacco flavor permitted.
Europe	France		below 20 mg/ml legal	legal	18	applies	prohibited	Since 26 February 2025, disposable e-cigarettes are illegal.
Europe	Georgia		legal	legal	18	applies	prohibited	
Europe	Germany		below 20 mg/ml legal	legal	18	applies only in Hesse	restricted	
Europe	Gibraltar		legal	legal	18	unknown	unknown	
Europe	Greece		below 20 mg/ml legal	legal	18	applies	restricted (print media) prohibited (all other media)	
Europe	Hungary		below 20 mg/ml legal	legal	18	applies	prohibited	
Europe	Iceland		below 20 mg/ml legal	legal	18	applies	prohibited	
Europe	Ireland		below 20 mg/ml legal	legal	18	applies	restricted	Planning to ban disposable vaping devices and limited flavours to tobacco flavour.
Europe	Italy		below 20 mg/ml legal	legal	18	applies	prohibited	
Europe	Kosovo		legal	legal	unregulated	unregulated	unregulated	The current tobacco control laws only apply to classic tobacco products (cigarette, fine-cut tobacco, cigars etc.)
Europe	Latvia		below 20 mg/ml legal	legal	20	applies	restricted	
Europe	Liechtenstein		legal	legal	16	applies	prohibited	
Europe	Lithuania		below 20 mg/ml legal	legal	18	applies	prohibited	Only tobacco flavor permitted.
Europe	Luxembourg		below 20 mg/ml legal	legal	18	applies	prohibited	
Europe	Malta		below 20 mg/ml legal	legal	18	applies	prohibited	
Europe	Moldova		below 20 mg/ml legal	legal	18	applies	prohibited	
Europe	Montenegro		below 20 mg/ml legal	legal	18	applies	prohibited	
Europe	Netherlands		below 20 mg/ml legal	legal	18	applies	prohibited	Only tobacco flavor permitted.
Europe	North Macedonia		legal	legal	18	applies	prohibited	
Europe	Norway		legal	legal	18	applies	prohibited	Import and sale of nicotine-containing cartridges legalized on July 1, 2023.
Europe	Poland		below 20 mg/ml legal	legal	18	applies	prohibited	
Europe	Portugal		below 20 mg/ml legal	legal	18	applies	restricted (print media) prohibited (all other media)	
Europe	Romania		below 20 mg/ml legal	legal	18	applies	prohibited	Lawmakers have plan to ban disposable vapes by 1 January 2026.
Europe	Russia		below 20 mg/ml legal	legal	18	applies	prohibited	
Europe	San Marino		legal	legal	18	applies	prohibited	
Europe	Serbia		legal	legal	18	applies	prohibited	
Europe	Slovakia		below 20 mg/ml legal	legal	18	unknown	restricted	
Europe	Slovenia		below 20 mg/ml legal	legal	18	applies	restricted	
Europe	Spain		below 20 mg/ml legal	legal	18	applies	prohibited	
Europe	Sweden		below 20 mg/ml legal	legal	18	applies	prohibited	
Europe	Switzerland		below 20 mg/ml legal	legal	18	applies	restricted	See also tobacco legislation in Switzerland.
Europe	Turkey		de facto ban	de facto ban	18	applies	prohibited	Regulation of e-cigarettes is done by law 4207, which regulates smoking and was amended in June 2013 by article 26 of law 6487 to also apply to items which do not contain tobacco: "Herbal water pipes and all kind of cigarettes which do not contain tobacco but are used in a way to imitate tobacco products shall also be deemed as tobacco products." This law requires for tobacco and related products to be licensed in order to be produced and to be imported. Since there have been no licenses given for production and importation has been banned. Vaping, being under regulation of the 4207th law, is thus forbidden indoors and on public transport, and also therefore forbidden for people under 18 years old. And thus, like tobacco products, personal import by mail or courier is forbidden. In May 2013 the Minister of Health stated that e-cigarettes, which contain nicotine, are medical devices and thus cannot be imported unless approved by the "Turkish Medicines and Medical Devices Agency". So far no such license has been issued.
Europe	Ukraine		below 20 mg/ml legal	legal	18	applies	prohibited	Only tobacco flavor permitted.
Europe	United Kingdom		below 20 mg/ml legal	legal	18	applies	prohibited	A ban on the sale and supply of disposable vaping devices was introduced on 1 June 2025.
Americas	Anguilla		legal	legal	unregulated	unregulated	unregulated	The existing laws do not apply to e-cigarettes.
Americas	Antigua and Barbuda		banned	banned	18	applies	prohibited	The sale and distribution of e-cigarettes is prohibited. The existing laws on tobacco control also apply to e-cigarettes.
Americas	Argentina		below 20 mg/ml legal	legal	18	applies	prohibited	Since May 2026, e-cigarettes have been regulated as tobacco products, replacing an earlier prohibition; only tobacco- and menthol-flavoured products are permitted, and disposable (single-use) e-cigarettes are banned.
Americas	Bahamas		legal	legal	unregulated	unregulated	unregulated	The existing laws do not apply to e-cigarettes.
Americas	Barbados		legal	legal	18	applies	restricted	
Americas	Belize		legal	legal	unregulated	unregulated	unregulated	
Americas	Bermuda		legal	legal	18	applies	restricted	
Americas	Bolivia		legal	legal	unregulated	unregulated	unregulated	There is no specific law regulating e-cigarettes.
Americas	Brazil		de facto ban	de facto ban	18	applies	prohibited	The import, sale and distribution of e-cigarettes is currently prohibited. However the law provides a potential avenue for the future sale of e-cigarettes. The existing laws on tobacco control also apply to e-cigarettes.
Americas	British Virgin Islands		legal	legal	unregulated	unregulated	unregulated	The existing laws do not apply to e-cigarettes.
Americas	Canada	Alberta; Manitoba; Quebec; Quebec; Northwest Territories; Saskatchewan	below 20 mg/ml legal	legal	18	applies	prohibited	Only tobacco flavor permitted in New Brunswick, Nova Scotia, Prince Edward Island, Quebec, Nunavut and the Northwest Territories.
Americas	Canada	British Columbia; New Brunswick; Newfoundland and Labrador; Nova Scotia; Nova Scotia; Nunavut; Ontario; Yukon	below 20 mg/ml legal	legal	19	applies	prohibited	Only tobacco flavor permitted in New Brunswick, Nova Scotia, Prince Edward Island, Quebec, Nunavut and the Northwest Territories.
Americas	Canada	Prince Edward Island	below 20 mg/ml legal	legal	21 (born after 1 March 2001)	applies	prohibited	Only tobacco flavor permitted in New Brunswick, Nova Scotia, Prince Edward Island, Quebec, Nunavut and the Northwest Territories.
Americas	Cayman Islands		legal	legal	unregulated	unregulated	unregulated	The existing laws do not apply to e-cigarettes.
Americas	Chile		banned	banned	unknown	unknown	unknown	E-cigarettes are banned from sale in Chile, including online purchase.
Americas	Colombia		legal	legal	18	applies	prohibited	
Americas	Costa Rica		legal	legal	18	applies	restricted	
Americas	Cuba		unknown	unknown	unknown	unknown	unknown	
Americas	Dominica		unknown	unknown	unknown	unknown	unknown	
Americas	Dominican Republic		legal	legal	unknown	unknown	unknown	
Americas	Ecuador		legal	legal	18	applies	restricted	
Americas	El Salvador		legal	legal	unregulated	unregulated	unregulated	The existing laws do not apply to e-cigarettes.
Americas	Falkland Islands		legal	legal	18	applies	restricted	
Americas	Grenada		legal	legal	unregulated	unregulated	unregulated	The existing laws do not apply to e-cigarettes.
Americas	Guatemala		legal	legal	unknown	unknown	unknown	
Americas	Guyana		legal	legal	18	applies	prohibited	
Americas	Haiti		legal	legal	unregulated	unregulated	unregulated	The existing laws do not apply to e-cigarettes.
Americas	Honduras		legal	legal	21	applies	prohibited	
Americas	Jamaica		legal	legal	18	applies	restricted	
Americas	Mexico		banned (several court decisions permitted individual retailers)	banned (several court decisions permitted individual retailers)	18	applies	prohibited	Generally the import, sale and distribution of e-cigarettes has been prohibited by law. However, several court decisions have granted individual retailers the right to sell e-cigarettes.
Americas	Nicaragua		banned	banned	unknown	unknown	unknown	
Americas	Panama		banned	banned	N/A (sale banned)	applies	prohibited	The sale of e-cigarettes, with or without nicotine, is prohibited under Law No. 315 of 2022.
Americas	Paraguay		legal	legal	18	applies	restricted	
Americas	Peru		legal	legal	unregulated	unregulated	unregulated	There is currently no law regulating e-cigarettes
Americas	Saint Kitts and Nevis		legal	legal	unregulated	unregulated	unregulated	There is currently no law regulating e-cigarettes.
Americas	Saint Lucia		legal	legal	unregulated	unregulated	unregulated	There is currently no specific law regulating e-cigarettes.
Americas	Saint Vincent and the Grenadines		legal	legal	unregulated	unregulated	unregulated	There is currently no law regulating e-cigarettes.
Americas	Trinidad and Tobago		legal	legal	unregulated	unregulated	unregulated	The existing laws do not apply to e-cigarettes.
Americas	Turks and Caicos Islands		legal	legal	unregulated	unregulated	unregulated	The existing laws do not apply to e-cigarettes.
Americas	United States	United States	legal	legal	21	state/local regulation	restricted	States and local authorities may impose further restrictions.
Americas	United States	Puerto Rico	legal	legal	21	applies	restricted	
Americas	United States	United States Virgin Islands	legal	legal	18	not regulated	restricted	
Americas	Uruguay		banned	banned	18	applies	prohibited	
Americas	Venezuela		de facto ban	de facto ban	18	applies	prohibited	In order for companies to import e-cigarettes, they are required to specify whether the product falls under the categories of medicinal, consumer goods, or tobacco derivatives. If classified as a tobacco derivative, e-cigarettes are prohibited from being sold to minors, advertised, promoted, or used in enclosed public spaces or transportation, as mandated by the tobacco control law. If classified as medicinal or consumer products, they must undergo thorough clinical trials similar to other nicotine replacement therapies before they can be sold, promoted, distributed, or used. Currently, no e-cigarette product has been registered, leading to the illegality of their sale, promotion, and distribution, as indicated in an alert.

== Africa ==
Currently, the majority of countries in Africa have implemented laws that govern the sale, distribution, importation, and usage of electronic cigarettes. However, the existing laws on tobacco control do not extend to e-cigarettes or other electronic smoking devices since they specifically define tobacco products as those made from the tobacco plant. As a result, regulations such as minimum age requirements for sales, smoking bans, advertisement bans, and other sales restrictions (such as online trading or vending machine sales) are not legally regulated and therefore permitted.

Notable exceptions to this trend are Ethiopia, Gambia, Mauritius, Seychelles, and Uganda, which have outright banned the manufacturing, sale, supply, and importation of electronic cigarettes. In the case of Ghana, although a ban on recreational e-cigarette sales is in place, there is a provision for exceptions in a medical context, effectively resulting in a de facto ban.

== Asia ==
Several countries and jurisdictions in Asia, including Bangladesh, Bhutan, Brunei, Cambodia, Hong Kong, Macau, Iran, Iraq, Lebanon, Maldives, North Korea, Oman, Palestine, Qatar, Singapore, Sri Lanka, Syria, Taiwan, Thailand, and Turkmenistan, have implemented bans on the importation, sale, and distribution of electronic cigarettes.

In Malaysia, e-cigarettes containing nicotine are classified as medicinal products requiring a medical prescription, while nicotine-free products can be legally sold without limitations. However, certain states such as Penang, Kedah, Johor, and Kelantan have enacted laws that completely prohibit the sale of e-cigarettes, regardless of nicotine content. Similarly, in Japan, e-cigarettes without nicotine can be freely sold, while those with nicotine are considered medicinal products requiring registration. As of now, no medicinal e-cigarettes have been approved. Nevertheless, the Ministry of Health, Labor and Welfare has issued a statement permitting the private importation of medicinal e-cigarettes for personal use, provided the imported quantity is less than a one-month supply.

On the other hand, countries like mainland China, Israel, Jordan, Kazakhstan, Kyrgyzstan, Saudi Arabia, and the United Arab Emirates have implemented laws that set maximum limits on the nicotine content allowed in e-cigarette liquids.

== Oceania ==
Laws and regulations concerning the production, import, sale, and usage of electronic cigarettes can vary significantly from country to country.

In the case of certain countries like Micronesia, Samoa, Solomon Islands, Tonga, American Samoa, and Vanuatu, there is currently a lack of specific regulations addressing e-cigarettes, or the existing tobacco control laws do not encompass e-cigarettes as tobacco products. Consequently, the existing regulatory framework does not apply to e-cigarettes in these jurisdictions.

In contrast, Australia has implemented the most stringent laws on e-cigarettes. As of October 1, 2021, obtaining a medical prescription has become a requirement for purchasing nicotine cartridges. This restriction also extends to the importation of e-cigarette products from overseas, which previously did not necessitate a prescription. Moreover, state and territory laws within Australia prohibit the sale and possession of e-cigarettes containing nicotine without a prescription. The process of acquiring a medical prescription for e-cigarettes in Australia generally requires smokers to have made unsuccessful attempts to quit smoking using Therapeutic Goods Administration (TGA) approved medications. These measures reflect the aim of ensuring strict control over the availability and use of e-cigarettes, particularly those containing nicotine, as part of a comprehensive tobacco control strategy.

== Europe ==
=== European Union ===
On 19 December 2012, the European Commission adopted its proposal to revise the European Union Tobacco Products Directive 2001/37/EC which included proposals to introduce restrictions on the use and sales of e-cigarettes. On 8 October 2013 the European Parliament in Strasbourg voted down the commission's proposal to introduce medical regulation for e-cigarettes, but proposed that cross-border marketing of e-cigarettes be regulated similarly to tobacco products, meaning that sales of e-cigarettes to under-18s would be prohibited in the European Union, along with most cross-border advertising. Warning labels also would be required. The Parliament and Member States are involved in trilogue discussions to reach a common conclusion.

In February 2014, the European Parliament approved new regulations for tobacco products, including e-cigarettes. The new regulations forbid advertising of e-cigarettes, set limits on maximum concentrations of nicotine in liquids, limit maximum volumes of liquid that can be sold, require child-proof and tamper-proof packaging of liquid, set requirements on purity of ingredients, require that the devices deliver consistent doses of vapor, require disclosure of ingredients and nicotine content, and empower regulators to act if the regulations are violated. In October 2014 e-cigarette manufacturer Totally Wicked won the right to challenge the directive at the Court of Justice of the EU. The hearing took place on 1 October 2015 and the results will not be announced until early 2016. In May 2016, the Court of Justice ruled to uphold the directive, which went into effect the same month.

In autumn 2013, the e-cigarette industry ran "a determined lobbying campaign" to defeat proposed European legislation to regulate e-cigarettes like medical devices. Pharmaceutical manufacturers GlaxoSmithKline and Johnson & Johnson have lobbied the US government, the Food and Drug Administration (FDA), and the EU parliament for stricter regulation of e-cigarettes which compete with their products Nicorette gum and nicotine patches.

== The Americas ==
=== Brazil ===
In Brazil, electronic smoking devices (ESDs), such as e-cigarettes and vapes, remain prohibited by federal health regulations. The original prohibition was established by Anvisa's RDC No. 46/2009, which banned the sale, import, and advertising of these products throughout the national territory. Following a lengthy regulatory review process initiated in 2019, Anvisa published RDC No. 855 in 2024, maintaining the prohibition and expanding the ban to include the manufacture, distribution, storage, transportation, and advertising of all electronic devices, including accessories, parts, and refills. The update also made it clear that any form of importation remains prohibited, including for personal use and for entry in baggage.

Although the regulation does not establish a general ban on individual consumption, Anvisa states that the use of these devices remains prohibited in enclosed public spaces, in line with Brazilian legislation on smoke-free environments. From a health standpoint, non-compliance with the rule may result in measures such as warnings, closure, confiscation, and fines, depending on the inspection by the competent authorities.

Despite this ban, the issue remains contested in Congress and in the public sphere. In Senate hearings, parliamentarians and experts have debated proposals to regulate the production and sale of electronic cigarettes.

=== United States ===
==== Federal regulation ====
Prior to 8 August 2016, regulations concerning the use of e-cigarettes varied considerably across the United States, although there is more variation regarding laws limiting their use by youth than regarding multi-level regulations, such as banning their use in public places. The FDA classified e-cigarettes as drug delivery devices and subject to regulation under the Food, Drug, and Cosmetic Act (FDCA) before importation and sale in the US. The classification was challenged in court, and overruled in January 2010 by Federal District Court Judge Richard J. Leon, explaining that "the devices should be regulated as tobacco products rather than drug or medical products."

In March 2010, the U.S. Court of Appeals for the District of Columbia stayed the injunction pending an appeal, during which the FDA argued the right to regulate e-cigarettes based on their previous ability to regulate nicotine replacement therapies such as nicotine gum or patches. Further, the agency argued that tobacco legislation enacted the previous year "expressly excludes from the definition of 'tobacco product' any article that is a drug, device or combination product under the FDCA, and provides that such articles shall be subject to regulation under the pre-existing FDCA provisions." On 7 December 2010, the appeals court ruled against the FDA in a 3–0 unanimous decision, ruling the FDA can only regulate e-cigarettes as tobacco products, and thus cannot block their import. The judges ruled that such devices would only be subject to drug legislation if they are marketed for therapeutic use – E-cigarette manufacturers had successfully proven that their products were targeted at smokers and not at those seeking to quit. The District Columbia Circuit appeals court, on 24 January 2011, declined to review the decision en banc, blocking the products from FDA regulation as medical devices.

In April 2014, the FDA proposed new regulations for tobacco products, including e-cigarettes. The regulations require disclosure of ingredients used in e-cigarette liquids, proof of safety of those ingredients, and regulation of the devices used to vaporize and deliver the liquid. The FDA proposed regulation would ban the sale of e-cigarettes with nicotine to any individual under 18 years of age. Additionally the report surveyed nine e-cigarette makers covering ten known brands (Mark-Ten (Altria), Vuse (Reynolds American), NJOY, Eonsmoke, LOGIC, V2, Vapor Couture (VMR Products), Blu (Lorillard Tobacco Company), Green Smoke, White Cloud Cigarettes (Lead by Sales)). The report criticized these companies for their youth marketing tactics and informed all nine of these companies. In August 2014, attorneys general from over two dozen states advised the FDA to enact restrictions on e-cigarettes, including banning flavors.

On 10 May 2016, the FDA published their deeming regulations in the Federal Register, which were to take effect on 8 August 2016. Vendors and companies had until two years afterward to prepare paperwork with the FDA to have their product remain on the market. Currently, there are lawsuits and amendments made in the works in Congress to change that provision. The lack of research on the risks and possible benefits has resulted in precautionary policymaking in the US "which often lacks grounding in empirical evidence and results in spatially uneven diffusion of policy". The time by which applications to market regulated non-combustible tobacco product devices must be submitted for review has been extended to August 8, 2022.

As of 8 August 2016, the FDA extended its regulatory power to include e-cigarettes. Under this ruling the FDA will evaluate certain issues, including ingredients, product features and health risks, as well their appeal to minors and non-users. The FDA rule also bans access to minors. A photo ID is required to buy e-cigarettes, and their sale in all-ages vending machines is not permitted. The FDA in September 2016 has sent warning letters for unlawful underage sales to online retailers and retailers of e-cigarettes. FDA regulations have also applied to the advertising of e-cigarettes since 2016. Per FDA regulations, e-cigarettes, e-liquid, and associated products cannot be advertised as safer than other tobacco products unless they have received modified risk tobacco product (MRTP) status. As of August 2018, this status has not been granted to any e-cigarette or e-liquid product. Though no companies have applied for an MRTP permit for their vaping products, similar heat-not-burn tobacco products have been denied MRTP status on the grounds that they are not safer than traditional cigarettes.

On December 5, 2016 HUD passed a rule banning the use of tobacco products in common areas and within each home unit. HUD did not include e-cigarettes in their list of prohibited tobacco products, and they will allow each public housing agency to make that decision. The ban includes cigarettes, cigars, pipes and waterpipes (hookahs). E-cigarettes were not included because they believe there would be no maintenance cost savings or a lowered risk of destructive fires. HUD commented that there is a lack of evidence that the vapor causes any damage to the units.

The FDA has been instrumental in the United States in regulating the use of E-Cigarette products.

Beginning in May 2018, the FDA began to crack down on e-liquid brands whose packaging resembles food or beverage products. FDA is particularly concerned about e-liquids whose packaging resembles that of candy, juice boxes, and other products intended to appeal to children, because of concern that children will mistakenly drink the e-liquid and die of nicotine poisoning. Nicotine is especially toxic to young children, and a 60 ml bottle of e-liquid with 11 mg/ml nicotine concentration, the average e-liquid bottle in the U.S., is likely to kill a child of age 4 or younger. As such, the FDA has charged e-liquid products with branding that resembles food, candy, or beverage items as being misbranded and using false advertising, which is illegal under the Tobacco Control Act of 2009 (specifically sections 903(a)(1) and 903(a)(7)(A) of the Food, Drug, and Cosmetic Act, 21 U.S.C. § 387c).

In September 2018, the FDA has further strengthened its Youth Tobacco Prevention Plan by targeting the e-cigarette industry with fines for retailers and manufactures that are illegally selling to youth. FDA commissioner Scott Gottlieb, M.D., has indicated that this is a first step in a new and significant enforcement strategy against the e-cigarette industry. In November 2018, the FDA announced new steps to curb youth vaping while still ensuring the adults who would benefit from e-cigarettes still had access to a healthier nicotine delivery system. Sales of flavored tobacco products will be limited to adult only stores and online vendors with the exception of tobacco, mint or menthol e-cigarettes that will remain for sales wherever combustible cigarettes are sold (convenience stores). If the FDA does not see a change in the illegal youth access of menthol or minty vapes currently 20% of their use, they will move to adjust their regulations. The decision to allow menthol vapes was to ensure that an alternative was present should an adult go to purchase menthol cigarettes. The age verification of online vendors for vape products will see an increased level of security.

In the midst of an outbreak of lung illness in the US linked to vaping products, Donald Trump said in September 2019 that his administration planned to propose a ban on e-cigarette liquid flavors. In December 2019, Congress enacted a law raising the age for sale of all tobacco products, including electronic cigarettes, from 18 to 21 years old. In 2020, the FDA ordered a halt on sales of vaping products with sweet and fruity flavors. The flavor restrictions did not apply to disposable e-cigarettes. Disposable's share of vaping sales more than doubled between 2020 and 2022. In 2021, the FDA denied marketing approval for a large number of e-cigarette products. In 2021, e-cigarette manufacturers Triton and Vapetasia asked the 5^{th} US Circuit Court of Appeals to review the FDA's denial of their flavored vape applications, with the court ruling in their favor. In 2025, the Supreme Court sided with the FDA and upheld the FDA's denial of the applications. In 2022, the FDA targeted the company Juul, denying it a marketing application and ordering Juul's products off of the US the market. However, some regulatory loopholes (specifically around disposable, pre-filled products) still allow flavored products from other companies.

Illegal flavored e-cigarettes are still easily available, in part due to a lack of enforcement of the regulations. The ban is considered unsuccessful and in March 2026, the FDA proposed authorizing some flavors considered appealing to adults specifically, for example mint, coffee and tea.

==== Trade associations and regulatory circumvention ====
The primary American trade association representing e-cigarette manufacturers and vendors is the Vapor Technology Association (VTA). In July 2025, the VTA launched an advertising campaign opposing illegally imported Chinese vaping products. However, investigative reports highlighted financial connections between the association’s leadership and overseas manufacturers of illegal disposable vapes, such as Geek Vape (manufacturers of Geek Bar).

The VTA and its executive director, Tony Abboud, have faced scrutiny regarding international ties. The association collaborated with the Electronic Cigarette Industry Committee of the China Electronics Chamber of Commerce (ECCC), forming the Global Vape Alliance alongside European counterparts including the UK Vaping Industry Association. In April 2026, U.S. Representative Brad Knott criticized the VTA over its ties to Chinese trade entities and the influx of unauthorized or counterfeit vaping products into the U.S. market, subsequently urging lawmakers to reject meetings with the organization.

Additionally, some overseas manufacturers have increasingly used synthetic nicotine analogs, such as 6-methylnicotine (marketed under names including Nixodine and Metatine), to bypass FDA pre-market review requirements. Reports indicate that certain products containing synthetic analogs have been mislabeled and marketed as “nicotine-free” to avoid regulatory oversight.

==== State regulation ====
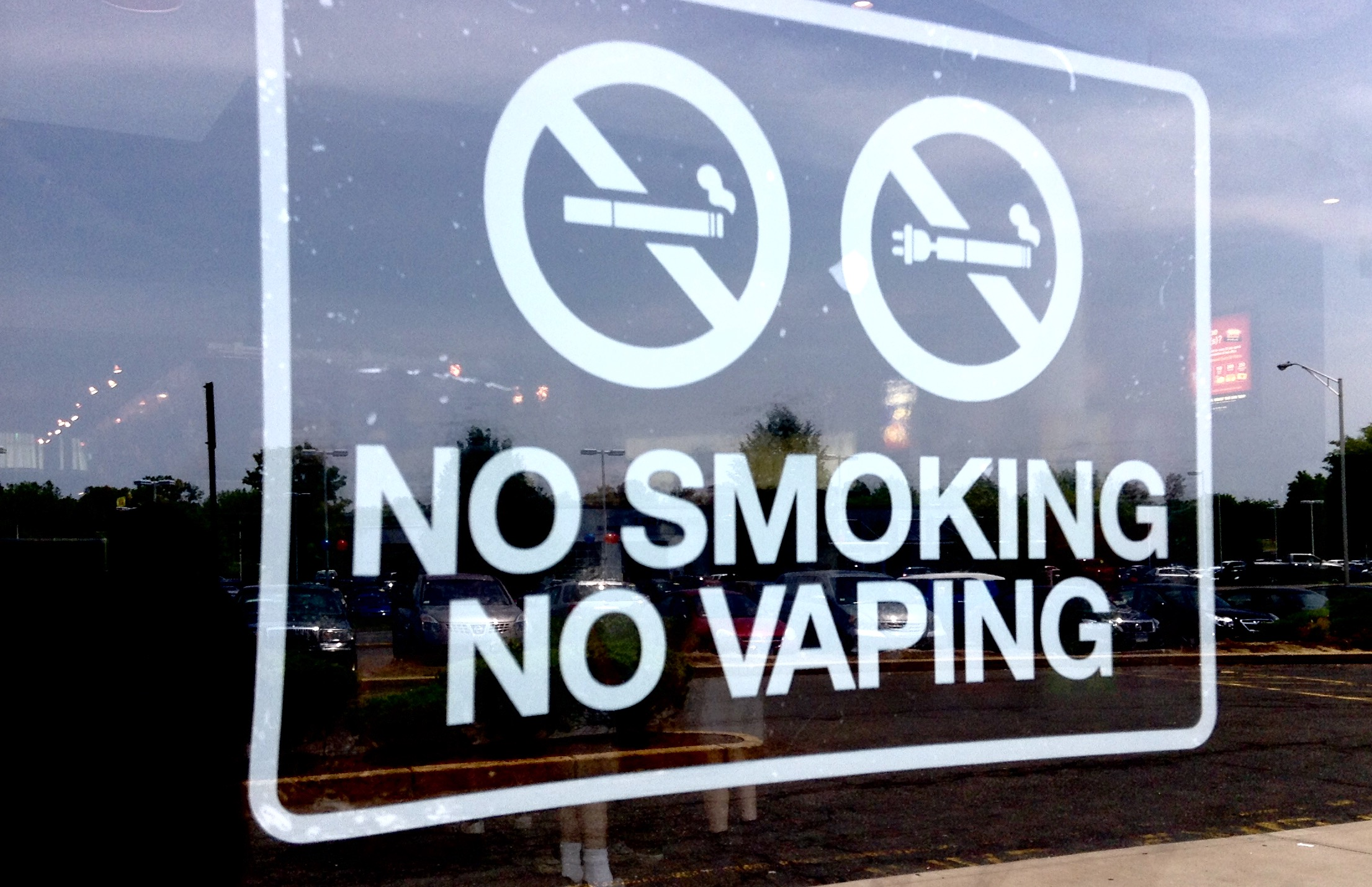
A no smoking or vaping sign from the US

In the United States, different measures have been taken to regulate e-cigarettes. In March 2010, New Jersey became the first state to implement e-cigarette Minimum Legal Sale Age Law (MLSA) and comprehensive indoor use ban in workplaces, restaurants, and bars. That same year, Minnesota imposed the first e-cigarette tax in the country. Six years later, the Food and Drug Administration's Center for Tobacco Products (FDA-CTP) deemed e-cigarettes to be tobacco products. In May 2016, the FDA-CTP made the following requirements: e-cigarettes are required to carry a warning label, a national e-cigarette MLSA of 18 was put in place, and the FDA-CTP must eventually approve all e-cigarette products through a pre-market application process.

Effective 8 August 2016, all US states will follow the same, uniform federal guidelines. With an absence of federal regulations, many states and cities had adopted their own e-cigarette regulations, most commonly to prohibit sales to minors, including Maryland, Kentucky, Minnesota, New Jersey, New Hampshire, Tennessee, Utah, Wisconsin, and Colorado. Other states are considering similar legislation. Several US cities and states have enacted laws that increased the legal age to purchase e-cigarettes to age 21. As of 2014, some states in the US permit e-cigarettes to be taxed as tobacco products, and some state and regional governments in the US had extended their indoor smoking bans to include e-cigarettes.

Governor Arnold Schwarzenegger vetoed a bill that would regulate the sale of e-cigarettes within the state on grounds that "if adults want to purchase and consume these products with an understanding of the associated health risks, they should be able to do so."

A review of regulations in 40 U.S. states found that how a law defines e-cigarettes is critical, with some definitions allowing e-cigarettes to avoid smoke-free laws, taxation, and restrictions on sales and marketing. Fewer policies have been created to restrict vaping indoors than with cigarette smoking.

Many local and state jurisdictions have recently begun enacting laws that prohibit e-cigarette usage everywhere that smoking is banned, although some state laws with comprehensive smoke-free laws will still allow for vaping to be permitted in bars and restaurants while prohibiting e-cigarettes in other indoor places. As of August 2016, the United States Navy is considering banning e-cigarettes. A 2017 report stated "As of 2 October 2015, five US states and over 400 counties have implemented some form of restriction of ECIG use indoors. International policies are more varied with certain restrictions for ECIG use in UK airports and trains and reports of complete ECIG bans in indoor public places for Malta, Belgium and Spain". San Francisco banned the sale of flavored e-liquids in 2018. They are the first city in the US to enact such a ban.

In November 2018, the FDA required e-cigarette manufacturers not to sell e-cigarette products online without strict age verification. It was also requested e-cigarette suppliers to end bulk purchasing of e-cigarettes and to remove flavored e-cigarettes from stores. In January 2020, the city of San Francisco banned e-cigarette (but not traditional cigarettes). By January 2020, twenty states had implemented e-cigarettes taxes, sixteen had comprehensively banned indoor use of the product, and eight had imposed temporary restrictions on the sale of all e-cigarettes or flavored e-cigarettes.

=== Policy evaluation studies ===
Studies that examine the impact of e-cigarette taxes on use of e-cigarettes and traditional cigarettes have found that e-cigarette taxes increase cigarette use across different populations (adults, children, pregnant), thus providing evidence that the two products are economic substitutes. Along the same line, another study found that e-cigarette minimum legal purchase age laws increase cigarette use among 12 to 17 years old, suggesting that e-cigarettes are displacing youth smoking rather than acting as a gateway to youth smoking. Regarding indoor vaping regulations, one study found that it increased prenatal smoking by about 0.8 percentage points had no significant impact on birth outcomes.

=== By country ===
The regulations surrounding the production, importation, sale, and use of electronic cigarettes can vary greatly from one country to another.

Several countries like Antigua and Barbuda, Nicaragua, and Uruguay have completely banned the importation, sale, and distribution of electronic cigarettes. In Mexico, there is a national ban in place, although some individual vendors have obtained the right to sell e-cigarettes through court decisions. On the other hand, Brazil and Venezuela have prohibited the importation, sale, and distribution of e-cigarettes, but their legal frameworks potentially offer a pathway for future legalization and sales.

Moreover, several Caribbean countries currently allow the sale of e-cigarettes. However, their existing tobacco control laws do not classify e-cigarettes as tobacco products, which means that regulations such as minimum age requirements for sale or restrictions on advertisements do not apply to e-cigarettes.

Canada stands out as the only country thus far that imposes restrictions on the sale of e-liquid with a maximum nicotine content of 20 mg per ml. This approach is similar to that taken by many European countries.

== Vaping bans ==
=== Criticism ===
Critics of vaping bans state that vaping is a much safer alternative to smoking tobacco products and that vaping bans incentivize people to return to smoking cigarettes. For example, critics cite the British Journal of Family Medicine in August 2015 which stated, "E-cigarettes are 95% safer than traditional smoking." In 2019, San Francisco's chief economist, Ted Egan, when discussing the San Francisco vaping ban stated the city's ban on e-cigarette sales will increase smoking as vapers switch to combustible cigarettes. Critics of smoking bans stress the absurdity of criminalizing the sale of a safer alternative to tobacco while tobacco continues to be legal. Prominent proponents of smoking bans are not in favor of criminalizing tobacco either, but rather allowing consumers to have the choice to choose whatever products they desire.

In 2022, after two years of review, the Food and Drug Administration (FDA) denied Juul's application to keep its tobacco and menthol flavored vaping products on the market. Critics of this denial note that research published in Nicotine and Tobacco Research found that smokers who transitioned to Juuls in North America were significantly more likely to switch to vaping than those in the United Kingdom who only had access to lower-strength nicotine products. This happened as the Biden Administration sought to mandate low-nicotine cigarettes which, critics note, is not what makes cigarettes dangerous. They also note that vaping does not contain many of the components that make smoking dangerous such as the combustion process and certain chemicals that are present in cigarettes that are not present in vape products.

=== Disposable electronic cigarettes ===
Some countries banned only disposable electronic cigarettes. On 1 January 2025, Belgium became the first country of the European Union to ban sale of disposable vapes. It was followed by France in February 2025 and the United Kingdom in June 2025.
