= Acetylesterase =

Class of enzymes which split acetic esters into alcohols and acetates

acetylesterase

Identifiers
- EC no.: 3.1.1.6
- CAS no.: 9000-82-2

Databases
- IntEnz: IntEnz view
- BRENDA: BRENDA entry
- ExPASy: NiceZyme view
- KEGG: KEGG entry
- MetaCyc: metabolic pathway
- PRIAM: profile
- PDB structures: RCSB PDB PDBe PDBsum
- Gene Ontology: AmiGO / QuickGO
Search
- PMC: articles
- PubMed: articles
- NCBI: proteins

In biochemistry, an acetylesterase (EC 3.1.1.6) is a class of enzyme which catalyzes the hydrolysis of acetic esters into an alcohol and acetic acid:

$$\ce{R-OC(O)CH3 + H2O} \quad \xrightarrow[\text{acetylesterase}]{} \quad \ce{R-OH + HO-C(O)CH3}$$

This enzyme belongs to the family of hydrolases, specifically those acting on carboxylic ester bonds (esterases). The systematic name of this enzyme class is acetic-ester acetylhydrolase. Other names in common use include C-esterase (in animal tissues), acetic ester hydrolase, chloroesterase, p-nitrophenyl acetate esterase, and citrus acetylesterase.

== Structural studies ==
As of late 2007, 3 structures have been solved for this class of enzymes, with PDB accession codes 1BS9, 1G66, and 2AXE.
