= John Middleton Co. =

American cigar manufacturer

John Middleton Co., a subsidiary of Altria Group, is the second largest manufacturer of large machine-made cigars, and a maker of pipe tobacco.

== Brands ==
Cigar brands sold by John Middleton include Black & Mild, Middleton's Cherry Blend, Gold & Mild and Prince Albert. Prince Albert cigars are available in Soft Cherry Vanilla and Soft & Sweet Vanilla varieties. Black & Mild is the top-selling cigar in the five-pack category in the United States, with nearly a third of the market in 2009.

Pipe tobacco brands include Prince Albert and Carter Hall. At one time they produced several now discontinued blends.

== History ==
In 1856, John Middleton opened a tobacco store in Philadelphia, Pennsylvania. Later, his family added more stores and a mail order business.

In 1950, the company began making its own pipe tobacco, and by 1959 sold its stores and concentrated on making and selling tobacco. In 1960, John Middleton Co. moved to King of Prussia, Pennsylvania. In 1968, using Middleton's Cherry Blend (its best-selling brand at the time), the company began making pipe-tobacco cigars. In 1980, Black & Mild became the company's second cigar brand, and its top seller by 1996.

By the late 1980s, John Middleton Co. had bought the pipe tobacco brands Kentucky Club, Prince Albert, Carter Hall, Apple and Royal Comfort.

In 1997, the company bought a facility in Limerick, Pennsylvania, which became its primary manufacturing location the next year. Processing remained at King of Prussia. Also in the 1990s, the company introduced two Prince Albert cigar brands.

In 2007, John Middleton Co. became a subsidiary of Altria Group. During the same decade, the company introduced several more Black & Mild cigar products, including one that was shorter than the others.

== See also ==
- John Middleton
