= Environmental impact of cigarettes =

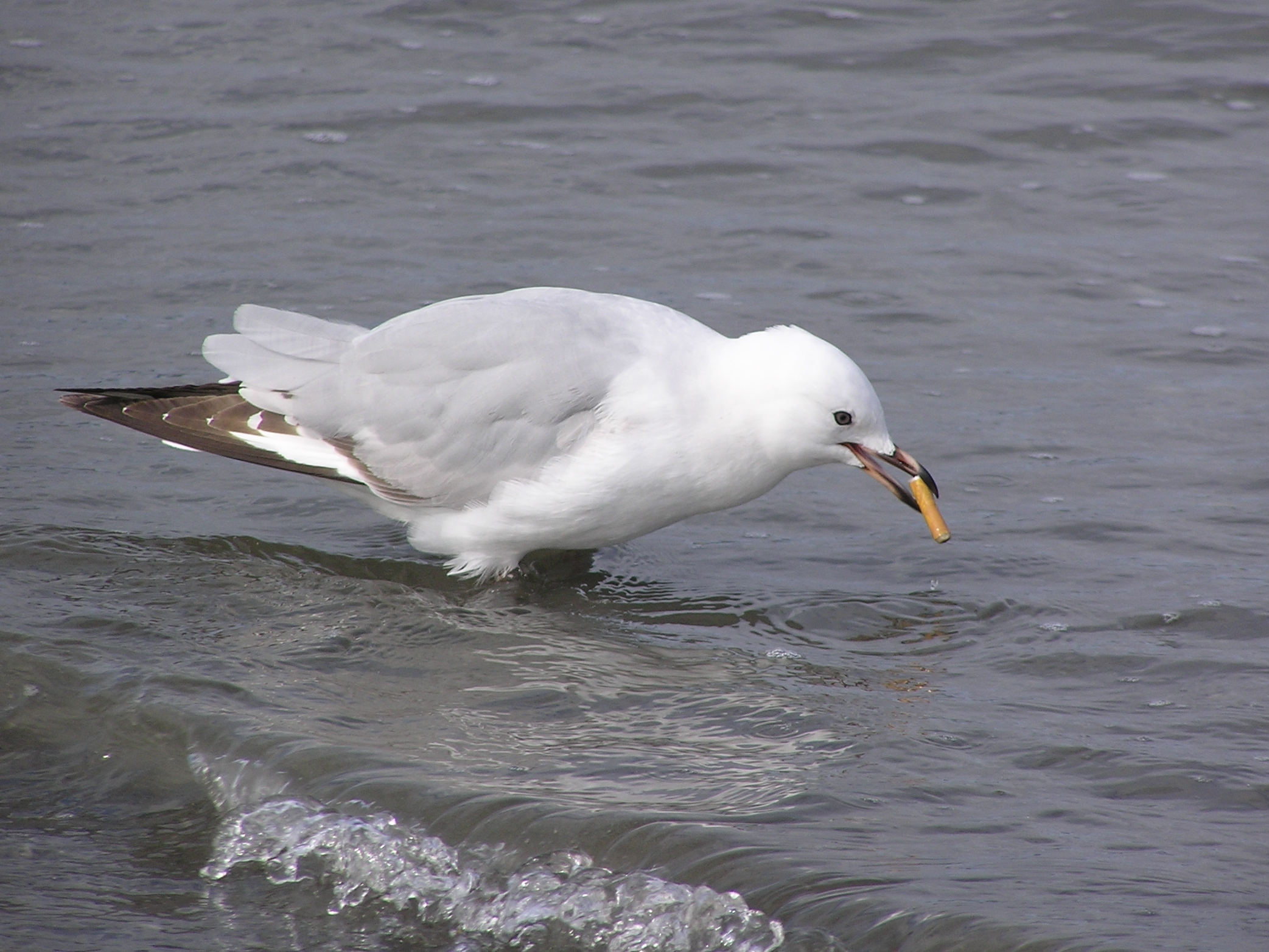
Juvenile red-billed gull

Cigarette filters are made up of thousands of polymer chains of cellulose acetate. Once discarded into the environment, the filters create a large waste problem. Cigarette filters are the most common form of litter in the world, as approximately 5.6 trillion cigarettes are smoked every year worldwide. Of those, an estimated 4.5 trillion cigarette filters become litter every year.

Disposable electronic cigarettes, also known as disposable vapes, have been linked to numerous environmental concerns. The single-use devices are seen as convenient, but have been found to create waste due to their complex composition and the difficulties inherent in recycling mixed materials, especially those with lithium batteries. Disposable e-cigarettes can contribute to environmental pollution through the potential release of toxic substances such as high amounts of lithium metal.

== Combustible cigarettes ==
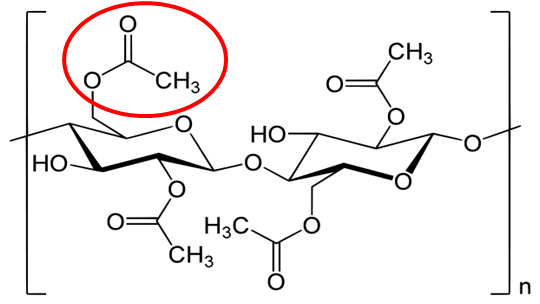
Simple molecular representation of cellulose acetate with one of the acetate groups on the cellulose backbone shown in the red circle

Estimated waste produced from filters
Number of filters	weight
1 pack (20)	3.4 grams (0.12 oz)
Sold daily (15 billion)	2,551,000 kilograms (5,625,000 lb)
Sold yearly (5.6 trillion)	950,000,000 kilograms (2,100,000,000 lb)
Estimated trash (4.5 trillion)	765,400,000 kilograms (1,687,500,000 lb)

Discarded cigarette filters usually end up in the water system through drainage ditches and are transported by rivers and other waterways to the ocean.

=== Aquatic life health concerns ===
In the 2006 International Coastal Cleanup, cigarettes and cigarette butts constituted 24.7% of the total collected pieces of garbage, over twice as many as any other category.

Cigarette filters contain the chemicals filtered out of cigarette smoke, which can leach into waterways and water supplies. The toxicity of used cigarette filters depends on the specific tobacco blend and additives used by the manufacturer. After a cigarette is smoked, the filter retains some of these chemicals, some carcinogenic. When studying the environmental effects of cigarette filters, the various chemicals that can be found in cigarette filters are not studied individually, due to the complexity of doing so. Researchers instead focus on the whole cigarette filter and its LD_{50}. LD_{50} is defined as the lethal dose that kills 50% of a sample population. This allows for a simpler study of the toxicity of filters.

One study has looked at the toxicity of smoked cigarette filters (smoked filter and tobacco), smoked cigarette filters (no tobacco), and unsmoked cigarette filters (no tobacco) for two exemplar marine species, marine topsmelt (Atherinops affinis) and freshwater fathead minnow (Pimephales promelas). The results of the study showed that for both species, smoked cigarette filters with tobacco are more toxic than smoked cigarette filters, but both are severely more toxic than unsmoked cigarette filters.

LD_{50} of cigarette filters to marine life (cigarette per liter)
Cigarette type	Marine topsmelt	Fathead minnow
Smoked cigarette filter (smoked filter + tobacco)	1.0	1.0
Smoked cigarette filters (no tobacco)	1.8	4.3
Unsmoked cigarette filters (no tobacco)	5.1	13.5

=== Other health concerns ===
Toxic chemicals are not the only human health concern posed by cigarettes; cellulose acetate and carbon particles that are breathed in while smoking are others. These particles are suspected of causing lung damage.

Another health concern to the environment is not only toxic carcinogens that are harmful to the wildlife, but also the filters themselves with or without harmful chemicals, as they pose an ingestion risk to wildlife.

The last major health concern to make note of is bioaccumulation. As marine species such as marine topsmelt and freshwater fathead minnow (as discussed in Aquatic life health concerns) ingest chemicals leached from cigarette filters, toxins build up in their bodies. When predators eat these fish and are eaten, toxins pass up the food chain. Smoldering cigarette filters have also been blamed for triggering fires from residential areas to major wildfires and bushfires which has caused major property damage, disruption to public safety services by triggering alarms and warning systems, and death.

=== Degradation and biodegradation ===
Most filters are made of cellulose acetate, which is slow to degrade. The threads of the acetate appear similar to cotton as the filter comes apart. Once in the environment the filters can experience biodegradation and photodegradation. The variance in rate and resistance to biodegradation in many conditions dictates environmental damage, sometimes taking up to twelve years to degrade.

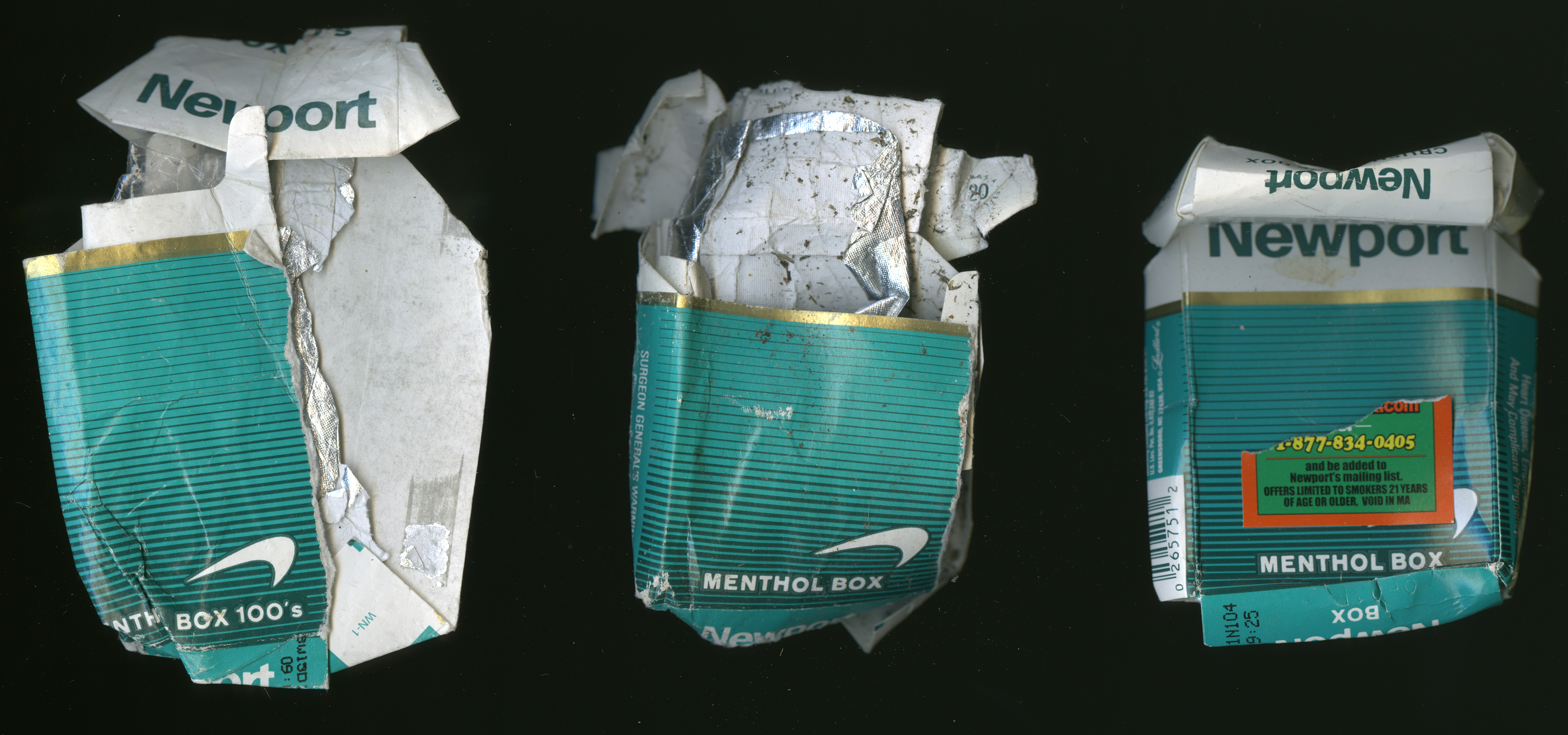
Discarded Newport cigarettes packs found in Olneyville, Rhode Island - 2008

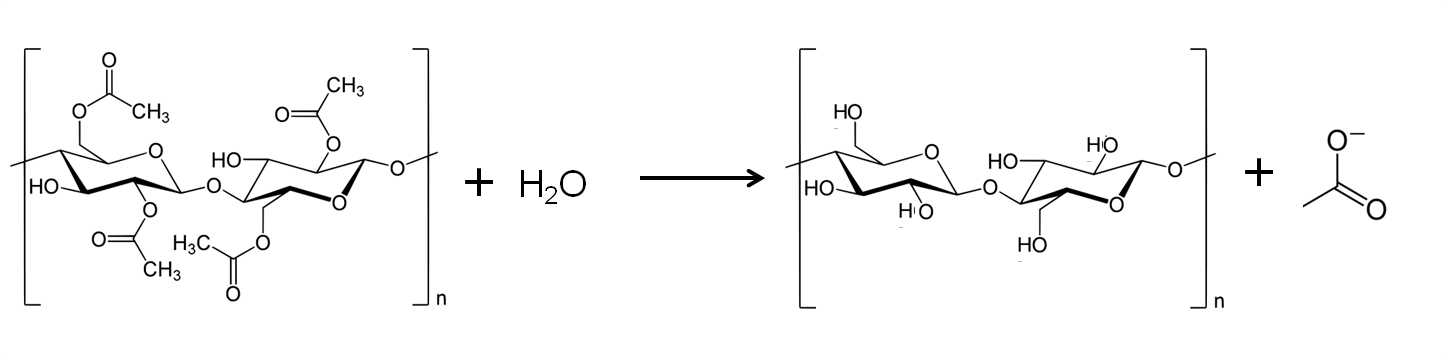
Chemical hydrolysis of cellulose acetate

The first step in the biodegradation of cellulose acetate is the deactylation of the acetate from the polymer chain (which is the opposite of acetylation). Deacetylation can be performed by either chemical hydrolysis or acetylesterase. Chemical hydrolysis is the cleavage of a chemical bond by the addition of water. Water (H_{2}O) reacts with the acetic ester functional group attached the cellulose polymer chain and forms an alcohol and acetate. The alcohol is simply the cellulose polymer chain with the acetate replaced with an alcohol group. The second reaction is exactly the same as chemical hydrolysis with the exception of the use of an acetylesterase enzyme.

The two substrates (reactants) are acetic ester and H_{2}O. The two products of the reaction are alcohol and acetate. This reaction is exactly the same as chemical hydrolysis. After the acetate group is removed from the cellulose chain, the polymer can be readily degraded by cellulase, an enzyme found in fungi, bacteria, and protozoans. Cellulases break down the cellulose molecule into simple sugars such as beta-glucose, or shorter polysaccharides and oligosaccharides.

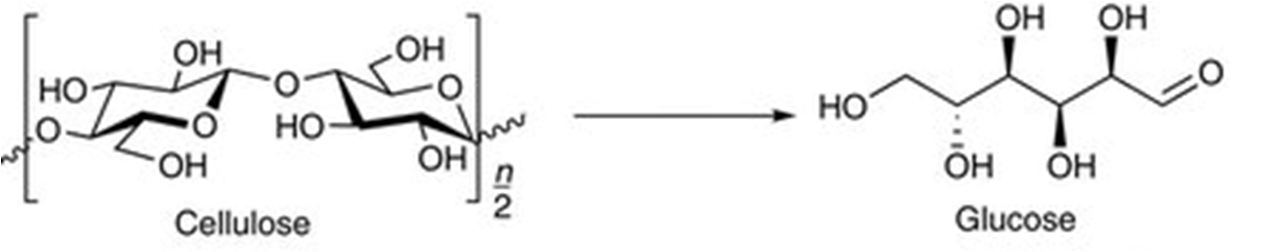
The chemical structure change of cellulose into glucose

These simple sugars are not harmful to the environment and are in fact are a useful product for many plants and animals. The breakdown of cellulose is of interest in the field of biofuel. Due to the various conditions that affect the process, there are large variations in the degradation time of cellulose acetate.

=== Factors in biodegradation ===
The duration of the biodegradation can range, taking as little as one month to fifteen years or more, depending on environmental conditions. The main factor that affects the duration of biodegradation is the availability of acetylesterase and cellulase enzymes. Without these enzymes, biodegradation only occurs through chemical hydrolysis. Temperature is another major factor. If the organisms that contain the enzymes are too cold to grow, then biodegradation is hindered. Oxygen in the environment also affects degradation. Cellulose acetate is degraded within 2–3 weeks under aerobic assay systems of in vitro enrichment cultivation techniques and an activated sludge wastewater treatment system. It is degraded within fourteen weeks under anaerobic conditions of incubation with special cultures of fungi, assuming ideal conditions (i.e. a suitable temperature, and sufficient available organisms to provide enzymes). Thus, filters last longer in places with low oxygen concentration, such as swamps and bogs.

=== Photodegradation ===
The other process of degradation is photodegradation, which is when a molecular bond is broken by the absorption of photon radiation (i.e. light). The primary photodegradation of cellulose acetate is considered insignificant to the total degradation process, since cellulose acetate and its impurities absorb light at shorter wavelengths. Research is focused on making up for some of the limitations of biodegradation like the addition of a compound to the filters that would be able to absorb natural light, using it to start the degradation process. Two areas of research are in photocatalytic oxidation and photosensitized degradation. Photocatalytic oxidation uses a reactive oxygen species (ROS), a reactive chemical, that absorbs radiation and creates hydroxyl radicals whose reaction with filters can start the breakdown process. Photosensitized degradation uses an ROS that absorbs radiation and transfers the energy to the cellulose acetate to start the degradation process. Both processes use other reactive oxygen species that absorbs light at > 300 nm to start the degradation of cellulose acetate.

=== Remediation projects ===
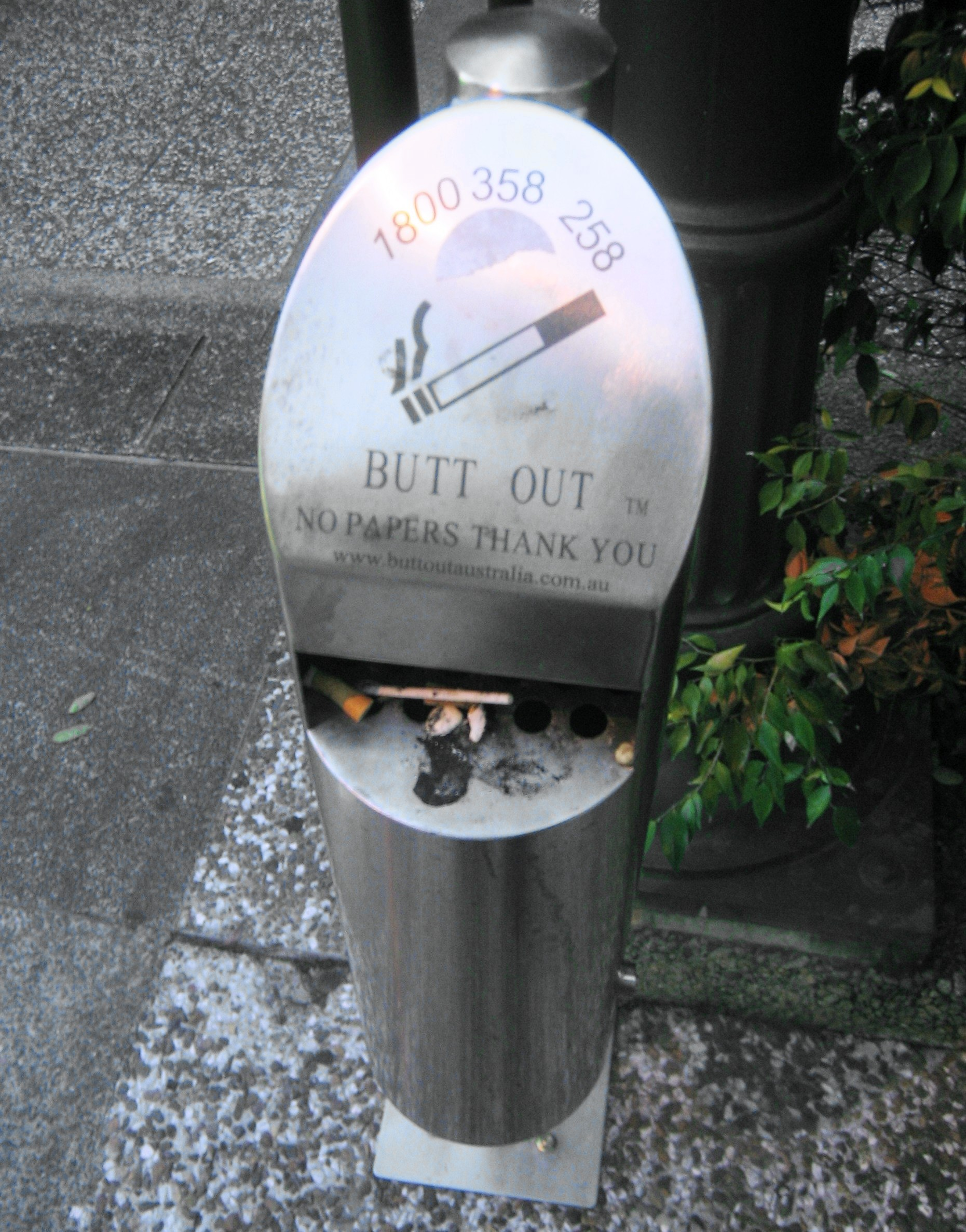
A cigarette disposal canister, encouraging the public to dispose of their cigarettes properly

Proper disposal into receptacles leads to decreased numbers of butts found in the environment and their can mitigate their effects on the environment. Another method is imposing fines and penalties for littering filters. Many governments have sanctioned stiff penalties for the littering of cigarette filters. Washington state, for example, has a penalty of $1,025. Other options include using cigarette packs with a compartment for discarding butts, implementing monetary deposits on filters, increasing the availability of receptacles, and expanding public education. Banning the sale of filtered cigarettes altogether on their adverse environmental effects is another option. One research group in South Korea has developed a simple one-step process that converts the cellulose acetate in discarded cigarette filters into a high-performing material that could be integrated into computers, handheld devices, electrical vehicles, and wind turbines to store energy. These materials have demonstrated superior performance as compared to commercially available carbon, grapheme, and carbon nanotubes. The product is showing promise as a green alternative for the waste problem.

== Disposable e-cigarettes ==
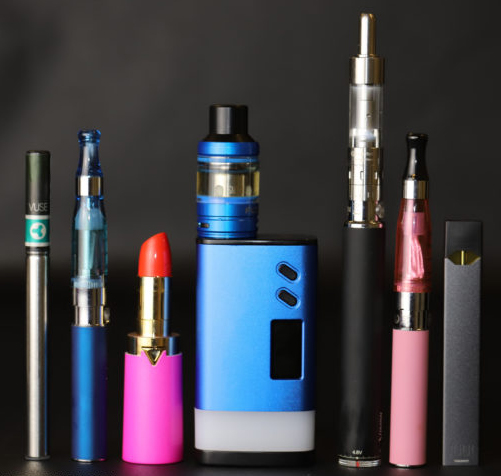

The use of disposable e-cigarettes has become popular worldwide. Unlike their rechargeable counterparts, disposable e-cigarettes require no maintenance or knowledge of vaping equipment.

=== Recycling challenges ===
In 2023 more than 1.3 million single-use e-cigarettes were discarded every week in Britain, contributing to electronic waste. Disposable e-cigarettes are difficult and expensive to recycle, as they include hard-to-separate materials. These include metals such as aluminum, lithium, copper and stainless steel, as well as plastics and electronic components. This places disposable e-cigarettes in three waste categories: plastic waste, electronic waste, and hazardous chemical waste. These waste materials come from e-liquid containers, packaging, and batteries.

Despite regulations requiring retailers to offer recycling take-back services, the effectiveness of these programs is limited, generally due to the size of the store offering the services. There is also no legal way to recycle disposable e-cigarettes, as they contain both electronic and hazardous waste. When these batteries are thrown into regular trash receptacles, they introduce the potential for both explosions and fires within waste collection and processing infrastructure, including recycling centers and garbage trucks.

A portion of the environmental impact of disposable e-cigarettes stems from the low rates of recycling:

- According to a survey of young people aged 14 to 25 in French-speaking Switzerland, 57% of those who use disposable electronic cigarettes throw them in a regular bin, while 8% recycle them.

Combined with the challenges associated with recycling disposable e-cigarettes, this contributes to their growing environmental footprint.

=== Environmental pollution ===
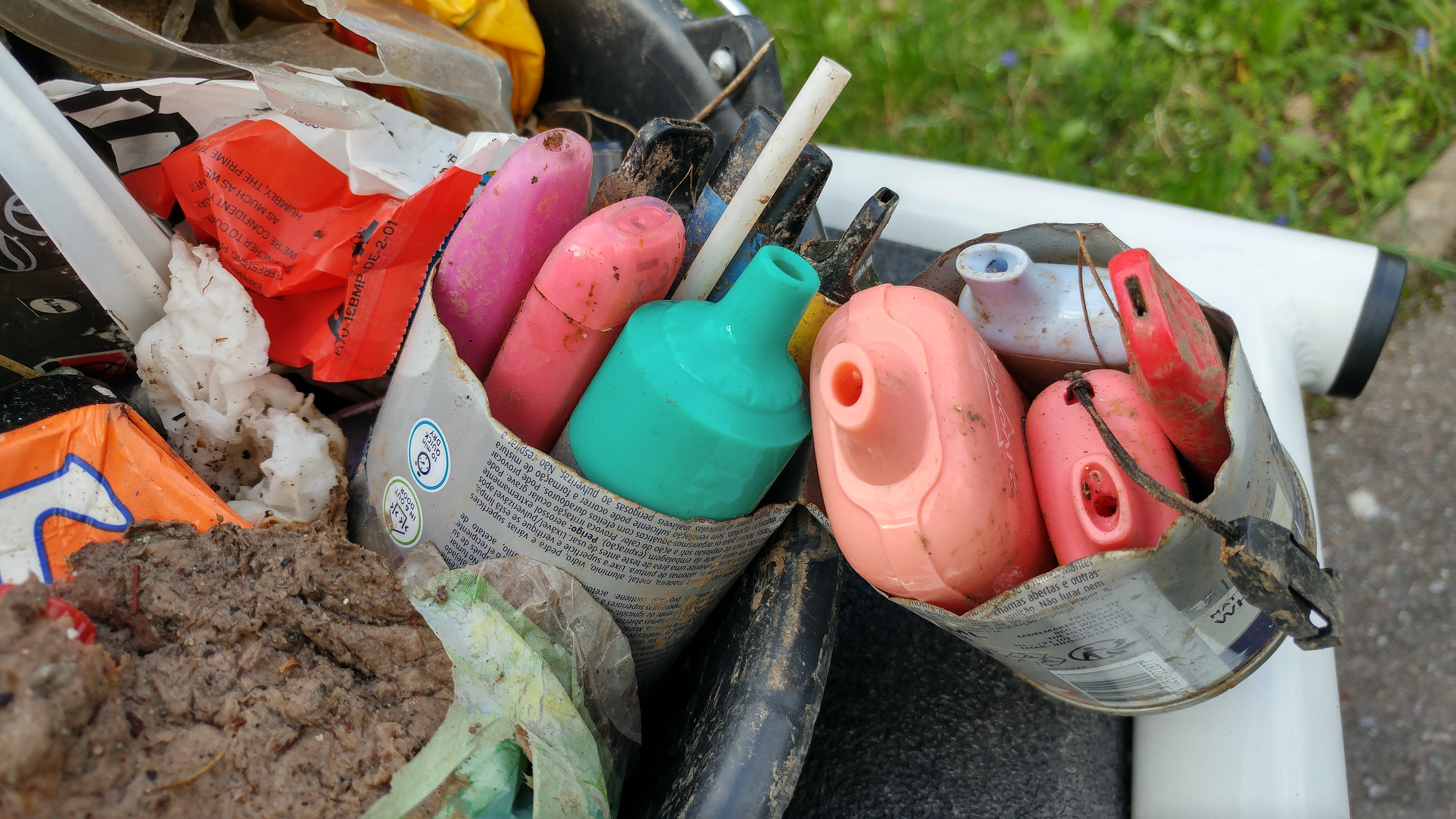
E-cigarettes collected during a district clean-up in Germany

E-cigarette batteries and circuit boards can release toxic chemicals into the environment, while their plastic casings can contribute to microplastic pollution. E-cigarette fluid is made of various hazardous substances, including nicotine, polycyclic aromatic hydrocarbons (PAHs), and metallic elements. Improper disposal of lithium batteries can cause fires at waste facilities.

=== Regulation ===
Some countries banned only disposable electronic cigarettes. On 1 January 2025, Belgium became the first country of the European Union to ban sale of disposable vapes. It was followed by France in February 2025 and the United Kingdom in June 2025.
