= Richard Barrington, 4th Viscount Barrington =

The Right Honourable The Viscount Barrington
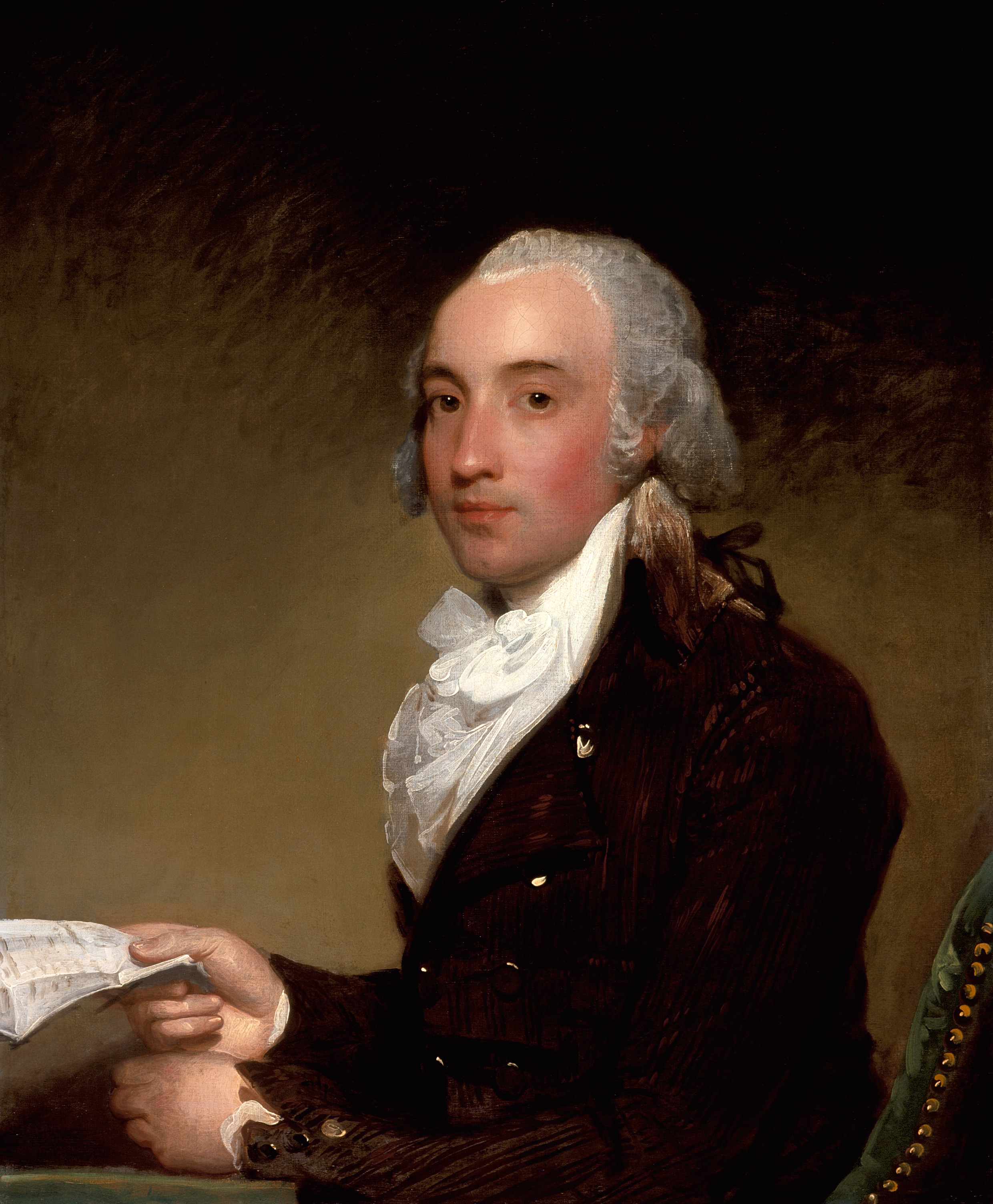
- Portrait by Gilbert Stuart, c. 1793–1794
- Born: Richard James Barrington
- Died: 8 December 1813; Valenciennes, France
- Spouse: Susan Budden (m. 1783)
- Parent(s): John Barrington; Elizabeth Vassal
- Family: John Barrington, 1st Viscount Barrington (grandfather); George Barrington, 5th Viscount Barrington (brother)

Richard James Barrington, 4th Viscount Barrington (died 8 December 1813) was a British peer.

== Early life ==
Richard James Barrington was the son of Maj. Gen. Hon. John Barrington and the former Elizabeth Vassal. His father, the Governor of Berwick, died in Paris in 1764.

His paternal grandparents were John Barrington, 1st Viscount Barrington, and Anne Daines (a daughter and co-heiress of Sir William Daines MP, Mayor of Bristol). His uncle was William served as the Chancellor of the Exchequer and became the 2nd Viscount Barrington. Other uncles were Daines Barrington, a lawyer, antiquarian and naturalist; Rear-Admiral Samuel Barrington of the Royal Navy; and Shute Barrington who became Bishop of Salisbury and Bishop of Durham. His maternal grandparents were Florentius Vassall, a wealthy planter and slave-owner, and Mary Foster (a daughter of Col. John Foster of Jamaica).

== Career ==
Upon the death of his uncle, the 2nd Viscount Barrington, who had no surviving children, his elder brother William became the 3rd Viscount in 1793. William had married Anne Murrell, a daughter of John Murrell of Thetford Abbey, but had no children. Therefore, after his brother's death in 1801, Richard became the 4th Viscount Barrington and inherited Beckett House at Shrivenham in the English county of Oxfordshire (formerly in Berkshire).

== Personal life ==
In 1783, Barrington was married to an American, Susan Budden (d. 1830), a daughter of Capt. William Budden and Louisa Cuzzins Budden, of Philadelphia. They had no children.

In 1785, American portrait painter Gilbert Stuart painted a portrait of Barrington's uncle, Admiral Samuel Barrington, in London. Stuart later painted a portrait of the 4th Viscount c. 1793–1794.

Lord Barrington died, without issue, on 8 December 1813 in at Valenciennes, France. He was succeeded in the Viscountcy by his younger brother, George.

Peerage of Ireland
Preceded by William Barrington	Viscount Barrington; 1801–1813	Succeeded by George Barrington
