= George Barrington, 5th Viscount Barrington =

British minister and aristocrat

The Right Honourable The Viscount Barrington
- Born: 16 July 1761
- Died: 4 March 1829 (aged 67); Rome, Italy
- Education: Christ Church, Oxford
- Occupation: Prebendary of Durham Cathedral
- Spouse: Elizabeth Adair (m. 1788)
- Children: 15
- Parent(s): John Barrington; Elizabeth Vassal
- Relatives: John Barrington, 1st Viscount Barrington (grandfather); Florentius Vassall (grandfather); William Barrington, 2nd Viscount Barrington (uncle); Samuel Barrington (uncle); Shute Barrington (uncle)

George Barrington, 5th Viscount Barrington (16 July 1761 – 4 March 1829), was a British minister and aristocrat.

== Early life ==
Barrington was born on 16 July 1761. He was the third son of Maj. Gen. Hon. John Barrington, who died in Paris on 2 April 1764, and the former Elizabeth Vassal (a daughter of Florentius Vassall, a wealthy planter and slave-owner, and Mary Foster, a daughter of Col. John Foster of Jamaica). Among his siblings were older brothers William Barrington, 3rd Viscount Barrington, who died without issue, and Richard Barrington, 4th Viscount Barrington, who also died without issue.

His paternal grandparents were John Barrington, 1st Viscount Barrington, and Anne Daines (a daughter and co-heiress of Sir William Daines MP, Mayor of Bristol). His uncle William served as the Chancellor of the Exchequer and became the 2nd Viscount Barrington. Other uncles were Daines Barrington, a lawyer, antiquarian and naturalist; Rear-Admiral Samuel Barrington of the Royal Navy; and Shute Barrington who became Bishop of Salisbury and Bishop of Durham.

== Career ==
Barrington was educated at Westminster School and Christ Church, Oxford, where he was admitted a King's Scholar in 1774. He graduated in 1782 with a Bachelor of Arts, and again from Christ Church, in 1785 with a Master of Arts in Holy orders.

He served as Rector of Sedgefield in County Durham, England. From 1796 until his death in March 1829, he served as Prebendary of Durham Cathedral.

Upon the death of his brother, he succeeded to the title of 5th Viscount Barrington of Ardglass, County Down, and 5th Baron Barrington of Newcastle, County Limerick.

== Personal life ==
On 12 February 1788, Barrington was married to Elizabeth Adair, a daughter of Robert Adair and Lady Caroline Keppel (the second daughter of Willem van Keppel, 2nd Earl of Albemarle), a descendant of Charles Lennox, 1st Duke of Richmond. Together, they were the parents of ten sons and five daughters, including:

- William Keppel Barrington, 6th Viscount Barrington, who married Hon. Jane Elizabeth Liddell, Lady of the Bedchamber to Dowager Queen Adelaide, the fourth daughter of Thomas Liddell, 1st Baron Ravensworth, in 1823.
- Hon. George Barrington (1794–1835), a captain in the Royal Navy who married Lady Caroline Grey, second daughter of Charles Grey, 2nd Earl Grey.
- Hon. Samuel Barrington (1796–1815), who was killed at the Battle of Quatre Bras.
- Hon. Augustus Barrington (1798–1860), who died unmarried.
- Hon. Caroline Elizabeth Barrington (1799–1890), who married her brother's brother-in-law, Hon. Thomas Liddell, the second son of Thomas Liddell, 1st Baron Ravensworth, and Maria Simpson (daughter and co-heiress of John Simpson and Lady Anne Lyon, second daughter of the 8th Earl of Strathmore and Kinghorne), in 1843.
- Hon. Russell Barrington (1801–1835), who married Marion Lyon, the only daughter of John Lyon of Hetton House, in 1832.
- Hon. Charlotte Belasyse Barrington (d. 1873), who married the Rev. Henry Burton, Rector of Upton Cressett, in 1845.
- Rev. Hon. Lowther John Barrington (1805–1897), who married Lady Catherine Georgiana Pelham, the second daughter of Thomas Pelham, 2nd Earl of Chichester, and Lady Mary Osborne (eldest daughter of Francis Osborne, 5th Duke of Leeds), in 1837.
- Hon. Henry Frederick Francis Adair Barrington (1808–1882), a barrister-at-law who married Mary Georgiana Knox, daughter of Col. Wright Knox, in 1848.
- Hon. Frances Barrington (1802–1849), who married, as his second wife, William Legge, 4th Earl of Dartmouth, in 1828.
- Hon. Georgiana Christina Barrington (1810–1881), who married, as his second wife, James Hamilton Lloyd-Anstruther of Hintlesham Hall, in 1847. From his first marriage, James was the father of Robert Hamilton Lloyd-Anstruther and grandfather of Sir Fitzroy Anstruther-Gough-Calthorpe, Bt.
- Hon. Elizabeth Frances Barrington (1811–1886), who married the Rev. Rev Thomas Mills, Chaplain-in-Ordinary to Queen Victoria and Rector of Stutton, in 1836.
- Arthur Barrington (1814–1826), who died young.

Lord Barrington died on 4 March 1829 in Rome. He was succeeded in his titles by his eldest son, William.

Peerage of Ireland
| Preceded by Richard Barrington | Viscount Barrington; 1813–1829 | Succeeded by William Keppel Barrington |
