= John Barrington (British Army officer) =

Major-General John Barrington
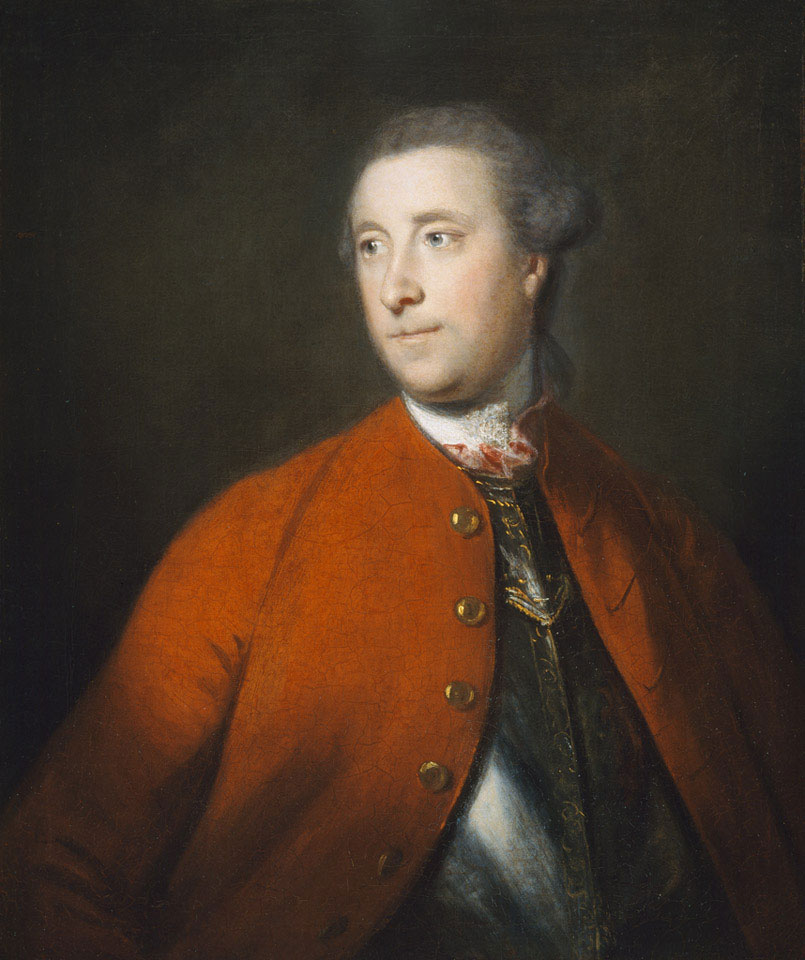
- Portrait by Sir Joshua Reynolds
- Died: 2 April 1764
- Spouse: Elizabeth Vassal
- Relatives: John Barrington, 1st Viscount Barrington (father)
- Military career
- Allegiance: United Kingdom
- Branch: British Army
- Rank: Major-General
- Conflicts: Seven Years' War

Major-General John Barrington (c. 1722 – 2 April 1764) was a British Army officer who was the third son of John Barrington, 1st Viscount Barrington.

== Early life ==
He was the second son of John Barrington, 1st Viscount Barrington and Anne (née Daines) Barrington (a daughter and co-heiress of Sir William Daines MP, Mayor of Bristol). Among his siblings was older brother William, who served as the Chancellor of the Exchequer and became the 2nd Viscount Barrington upon their father's death in 1734. His younger brothers included Daines Barrington, a lawyer, antiquarian and naturalist; Rear-Admiral Samuel Barrington of the Royal Navy; and Shute Barrington who became Bishop of Salisbury and Bishop of Durham.

== Career ==
He served in the 3rd Foot Guards, and in 1746, he obtained the commission of Captain-lieutenant in the 2nd Foot Guards, in which corps he was promoted to the rank of Captain and Lieutenant-colonel in 1748. In 1756, he was promoted to the rank of Colonel, and appointed aide-de-camp to King George II.

In 1758, the King gave him the colonelcy of the 64th Regiment of Foot, then formed from the second battalion of the 11th, promoted him to the local rank of major-general in the West Indies, and sent him second-in-command of an expedition against the French West India Islands. Major-General Peregrine Hopson died in the West Indies and command of the troops devolved on Major-General Barrington. During the Invasion of Guadeloupe Barrington transferred most of the soldiers from Fort Royal, Martinique, to Fort Louis on the Grande-Terre side of Guadeloupe. In March he used this as a base from which naval transport carried separate forces under Brigadiers Byam Crump and John Clavering to attack French positions around the island. The attacks were highly effective, and the French capitulated on 2 May 1759.

In June 1759, Barrington was removed to the 40th Regiment, and on 24 October the same year to the 8th, or the King's; he was also appointed Governor of Berwick.

== Personal life ==
Barrington was married to Elizabeth Vassal, the daughter of Florentius Vassall, a wealthy planter and slave-owner, and Mary Foster (a daughter of Col. John Foster of Jamaica). Together, they were the parents of:

- William Barrington, 3rd Viscount Barrington, who married Anne Murrell, daughter of John Murrell of Thetford Abbey.
- Richard Barrington, 4th Viscount Barrington, who married Susan Budden, daughter of William Budden of Philadelphia.
- George Barrington, 5th Viscount Barrington, who married Elizabeth Adair, a daughter of Robert Adair and Lady Caroline Keppel (daughter of Willem van Keppel, 2nd Earl of Albemarle).
- Hon. Louisa Barrington, who married Rev Tristram. After his death in 1796, she married Thomas Cooke.

He died in Paris on 2 April 1764.

Military offices
Preceded by Edward Wolfe	Colonel of the 8th (The King's) Regiment of Foot; 1759–1764	Succeeded by John Stanwix
Preceded by New regiment	Colonel of the 64th Regiment of Foot; 1758–1759	Succeeded by George Townshend, 1st Marquess Townshend
