= Viscount Barrington =

Noble peerage

Viscountcy Barrington
- Creation date: 1720
- Created by: George I
- Peerage: Peerage of Ireland
- First holder: John Barrington
- Last holder: Patrick Barrington
- Status: Extinct
- Extinction date: 6 April 1990
- Motto: Ung durant ma vie (The same while I live)

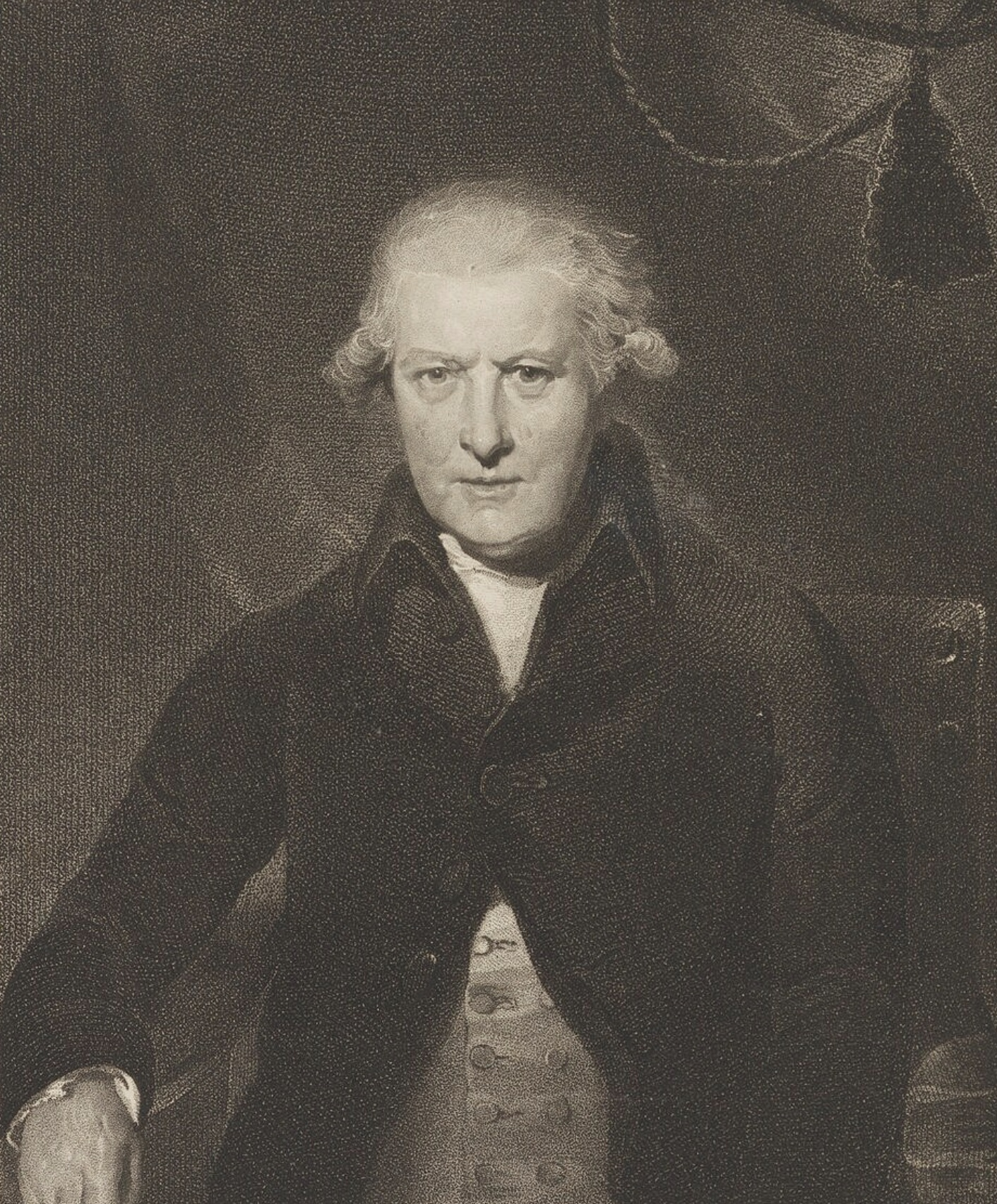
William Barrington, 2nd Viscount Barrington

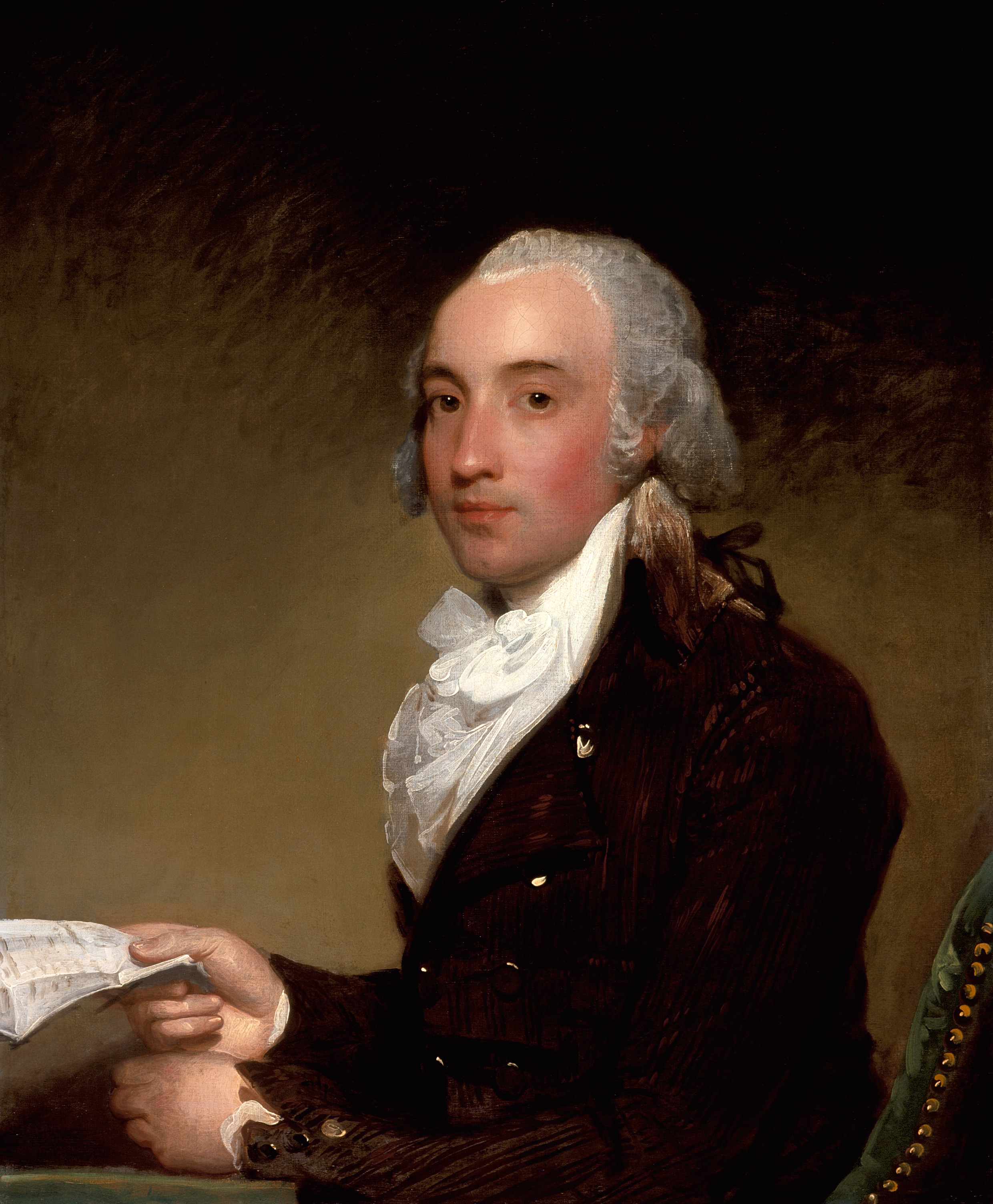
Richard Barrington, 4th Viscount Barrington

Viscount Barrington, of Ardglass in the County of Down, was a title in the Peerage of Ireland. It was created in 1720 for the lawyer, theologian and politician John Barrington. He was made Baron Barrington, of Newcastle in the County of Limerick, also in the Peerage of Ireland, at the same time.

Born John Shute, he had assumed by Act of Parliament the surname of Barrington in lieu of his patrilineal surname in 1716, having previously succeeded to the estates of Frances Barrington, married to his cousin.

Four of the younger sons of the first Viscount gained distinction. John Barrington (c. 1722 – 1764) was a Major-General in the British Army. Daines Barrington was a lawyer, antiquarian and naturalist. Samuel Barrington was a Rear-Admiral in the Royal Navy. The Right Reverend Shute Barrington was Bishop of Salisbury and Bishop of Durham.

The first viscount was succeeded by his son, the second Viscount. He was a politician and served as Chancellor of the Exchequer between 1761 and 1762. He had no surviving children and was succeeded by his nephew, the third Viscount. He was the eldest son of the aforementioned Major-General John Barrington, second son of the first Viscount. Both the third Viscount and his younger brother, the fourth Viscount, died childless. Their younger brother, the fifth viscount, had fifteen children.

On his death in 1829 the titles passed to his eldest son, the sixth Viscount. A Member of Parliament he was also Chairman of the Great Western Railway. He was succeeded by his eldest son, the seventh Viscount. He was a Conservative politician and held office as Captain of the Yeomen of the Guard between 1885 and 1886 and as Captain of the Honourable Corps of Gentlemen-at-Arms in 1886. In 1880, he was created Baron Shute, of Beckett in the County of Berkshire, in the Peerage of the United Kingdom, which entitled him to an automatic seat in the House of Lords. The title was created with special remainder to his younger brother, the Hon. Percy Barrington.

Lord Barrington had two daughters but no sons and was succeeded (in the barony of Shute according to the special remainder) by his brother Percy, the eighth Viscount. The titles descended in the direct line until the death of his grandson, the tenth Viscount, in 1960. The late Viscount was succeeded by his nephew, the eleventh Viscount. He was the son of the Hon. Walter Barrington, second son of the ninth Viscount, who was a writer of humorous verse. Lord Barrington was unmarried, and on his death in 1990, all the titles became extinct.

== Viscount Barrington (1720) ==
- John Shute Barrington, 1st Viscount Barrington (1678–1734)
- William Wildman Shute Barrington, 2nd Viscount Barrington (1717–1793)
- William Wildman Barrington, 3rd Viscount Barrington (died 1801)
- Richard James Barrington, 4th Viscount Barrington (died 1814)
- George Barrington, 5th Viscount Barrington (1761–1829)
- William Keppel Barrington, 6th Viscount Barrington (1793–1867)
- George William Barrington, 7th Viscount Barrington, 1st Baron Shute (1824–1886) (created Baron Shute in 1880)
- Percy Barrington, 8th Viscount Barrington, 2nd Baron Shute (1825–1901)
- Walter Bulkeley Barrington, 9th Viscount Barrington, 3rd Baron Shute (1848–1933)
- William Reginald Shute Barrington, 10th Viscount Barrington, 4th Baron Shute (1873–1960)
- Patrick William Daines Barrington, 11th Viscount Barrington, 5th Baron Shute (1908–1990)

=== Title succession chart ===
Title succession chart, Viscounts Barrington and Barons Shute.

John Barrington; 1st Viscount Barrington; 1678–1734
William Barrington; 2nd Viscount Barrington; 1717–1793	Maj.Gen. Hon. John Barrington c. 1722 – 1764	Hon. Daines Barrington; 1727–1800	Adm. Hon. Samuel Barrington; 1729–1800	Rt Rev. Hon. Shute Barrington; 1734–1826
William Barrington; 3rd Viscount Barrington died 1801	Richard Barrington; 4th Viscount Barrington died 1813	George Barrington; 5th Viscount Barrington; 1761–1829
William Barrington; 6th Viscount Barrington; 1793–1867	Capt. Hon. George Barrington; 1794–1835	Hon. Samuel Barrington; 1796–1815	Hon. Augustus Barrington; 1798–1860	Hon. Russell Barrington; 1801–1835	Rev. Hon. Lowther Barrington; 1805–1897	Hon. Henry Barrington; 1808–1882	Hon. Arthur Barrington; 1814–1826
Baron Shute (UK)
George Barrington; 7th Viscount Barrington; 1st Baron Shute; 1824–1886	Percy Barrington; 8th Viscount Barrington; 2nd Baron Shute; 1825–1901	Hon. Sir; William Barrington; 1842–1922	Hon. Sir; Eric Barrington; 1847–1918	Charles Barrington; 1827–1911	Russell Barrington; 1840–1916	Rev. Ythil Barrington; 1843–1904	John Barrington; 1849–1901	Henry Barrington; 1852–1919	Samuel Barrington; 1855–1931
Walter Barrington; 9th Viscount Barrington; 3rd Baron Shute; 1848–1933	Guy Barrington; 1869–1960	Malcolm Barrington; 1879–?
William Barrington; 10th Viscount Barrington; 4th Baron Shute; 1873–1960	Hon. Walter Barrington; 1876–1959	Lt Col. Hon. Rupert Barrington; 1877–?	Lt. Hon. Percy Barrington; 1884–1911
Patrick Barrington; 11th Viscount Barrington; 5th Baron Shute; 1908–1990	Capt. Eric Barrington; 1904–?	Fg Off. Miguel Barrington; 1909–1937
Titles extinct

== Notes ==
- Hesilrige, Arthur G. M. (1921). Debrett's Peerage and Titles of courtesy. London: London: Dean & son, limited. p. 91.
- Leigh Rayment's Peerage Pages
