= Patrick Barrington, 11th Viscount Barrington =

The Right Honourable The Lord Barrington

Member of the House of Lords Lord Temporal
- In office 4 October 1960 – 6 April 1990 as a hereditary peer
- Preceded by: The 10th Viscount Barrington

Personal details
- Born: Patrick William Daines Barrington; 29 October 1908
- Died: 6 April 1990 (aged 81) St Peter's Hospital, Chertsey
- Parent(s): Hon. Walter Barrington; Eleanor Snagge
- Education: Eton College
- Alma mater: Magdalen College, Oxford
- Known for: Poetry, work at Bletchley Park

Patrick William Daines Barrington, 11th Viscount Barrington (29 October 1908 – 6 April 1990), was an Irish peer and a writer of humorous verse.

== Early life ==
Known to his family as "Pip," he was the only son of the Hon. Walter Bernard Louis Barrington, a merchant banker (a partner of Sir Lawrence Jones, Bt), and Eleanor Nina Snagge. His younger sister, Gillian Mary Barrington, married Maj. Richard Cosmo Alderson, son of Sir Edward Hall Alderson.

His paternal grandparents were Walter Barrington, 9th Viscount Barrington and the former Mary Isabella Bogue. In 1936, following the death the previous year of his grandfather's second wife, Charlotte, the dowager Viscountess Barrington, Beckett Hall, the family seat and estate were bought by the War Office for use as an artillery training school.

He was educated at Eton College and at Magdalen College, Oxford University. "In his younger days, as Patrick Barrington, he was a poet, publisher and puppeteer of delightful wit and ingenuity."

== Career ==
After University, "he dabbled in diplomacy for a spell as an honorary attaché at the British Embassy in Berlin; but his unstoppable flow of conversation and untidy appearance did not find favour with the formidable Ambassador, Sir Horace Rumbold." He was called to the bar by Inner Temple.

During the Second World War, from 1940 to 1945, he worked at Bletchley Park decrypting German and Japanese messages. He was a member of the Bletchley Park Drama Group. After the War, he worked in publishing becoming one of the early partners in Weidenfeld & Nicolson.

On 4 October 1960, he succeeded his uncle, William Barrington, to the titles of 5th Baron Shute of Becket, co. Berks; 11th Viscount Barrington of Ardglass, County Down; and 11th Baron Barrington of Newcastle, County Limerick.

In his later years, he "became a leading figure in the pro-life movement. He was a dedicated opponent of abortion legislation, and drafted the original aims and objects of the Society for the Protection of Unborn Children, of which he was chairman. He was also a founding member of the committee of the Human Rights Society, working to ensure that euthanasia did not reach the statute book."

=== Poetry ===
He is remembered for his humorous verse, which was featured in Punch magazine during the 1930s. A collection of his poems, including his best-known work, The Diplomatic Platypus, was published as Songs of a Sub-Man by Patrick Barrington (Methuen & Company Ltd, 1934).

== Personal life ==
Lord Barrington, who lived with his eldest niece Jane (née Alderson) Carter in Oaktree Close, Virginia Water, never married, died in St Peter's Hospital, Chertsey, on 6 April 1990, upon which his titles became extinct.

Peerage of Ireland
Preceded by William Barrington	Viscount Barrington; 1960–1990	Extinct
Peerage of the United Kingdom
Preceded by William Barrington	Baron Shute; 1960–1990; Member of the House of Lords (1960–1990)	Extinct
