= Harburg lottery =

1720 British scandal

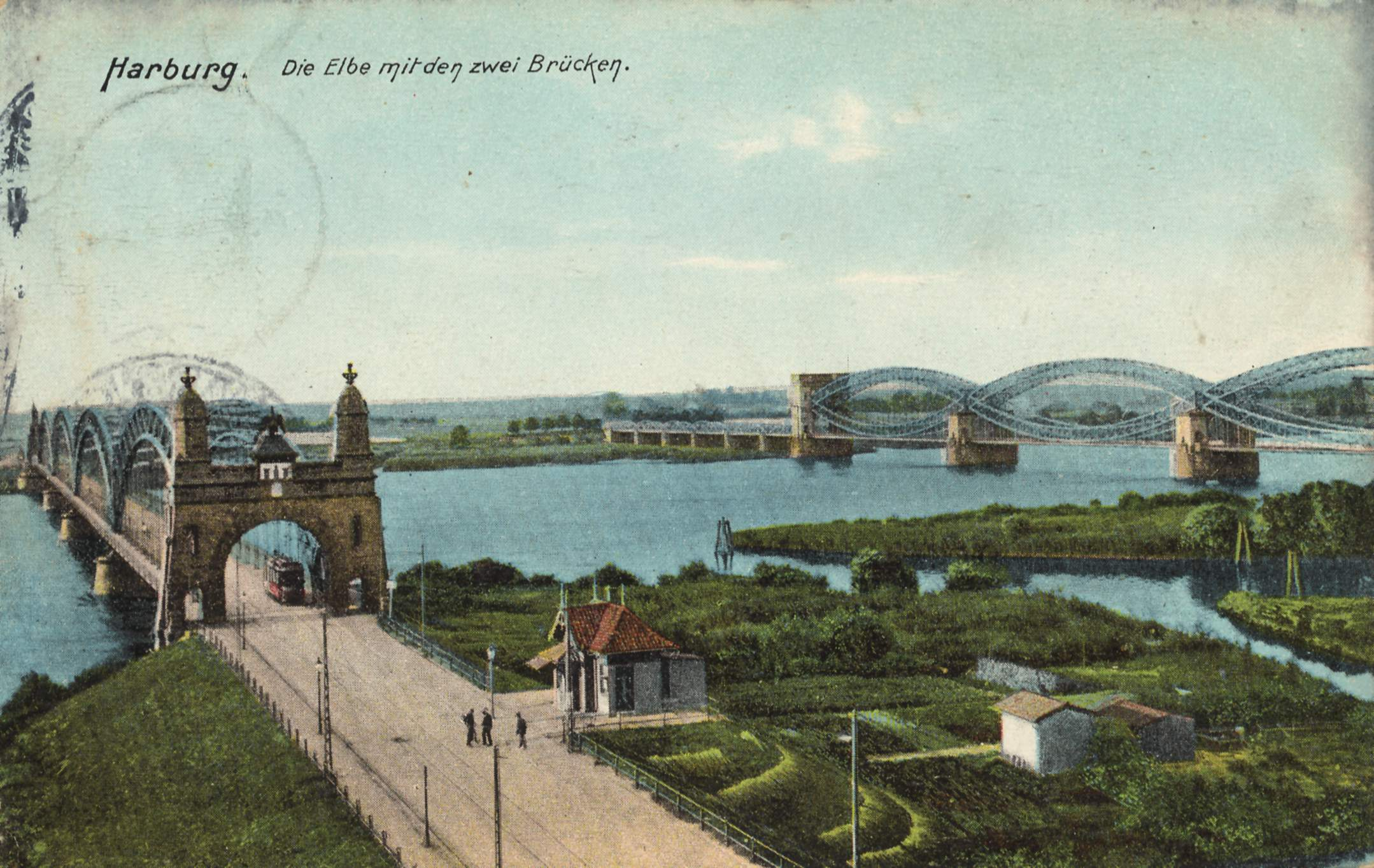
The River Elbe at Harburg

The Harburg lottery was a dubious lottery scheme established in 1720 in the port of Harburg in the Electorate of Hanover.

At that time, the Electorate of Hanover was ruled in personal union with Great Britain, as the Prince-Elector of Hanover had become King of Great Britain in 1714. A charter granted on 30 November 1720 by George I of Great Britain as Elector granted the Harburg Company commercial privileges in Hanover, including the right to hold a lottery at Harburg, on condition that they undertook to improve the port of Harburg. The titular head of the company was the king's grandson, Prince Frederick but the driving force behind it was John Barrington, the British MP for Berwick and a prominent Presbyterian Dissenter, who was given the post of sub-Governor.

The company proceeded with a scheme to organise the lottery, whereby 500,000 tickets would be sold at £3 each. One third of the tickets would win prizes to a total of £1,000,000, creating a gross profit of £500,000. The net profit after "management charges" would constitute the capital of the company in which losing ticket holders would be shareholders. The main concern was the amount, some £210,000, that would be paid to Barrington and his co-directors, which included the Deputy Governors Sir Thomas Webster, MP, the appropriately named Sir Charles Wager, MP and Robert Baylis.

Barrington's main task was to use his influence with the British government to allow the lottery to operate in England, without which the scheme would fail. He was advised by senior ministers in the British Government that the scheme was neither prudent or acceptable but nevertheless pressed on, claiming the King's approval and backing. A week later Parliament set up an enquiry which produced a report on 1 February 1743 condemning the enterprise. The House of Commons Parliament, without a division, passed a resolution declaring the lottery to be fraudulent and illegal, condemned Barrington's use of the King's name, and ordered all ticket sales to be refunded.

On 15 February, after hearing Barrington's defence, Parliament resolved that Barrington had been guilty of promoting, abetting, and carrying on a fraudulent undertaking and expelled him from the House of Commons.
