= Pennyhooks Farm Trust =

Farm-based charity in Oxfordshire, England

The Pennyhooks Farm Trust (formerly known as the Pennyhooks Project) is a farm-based programme for children with autism spectrum disorders in Shrivenham, Oxfordshire, United Kingdom.

A usual day for the students involves mainly farm-based activities including animal care and countryside skills such as conservation, as well as training in craft skills and horticulture. The farm specialises in raising Aberdeen Angus cattle and also sells organic eggs locally.

Open Days such as a Plant Sale and Christmas Fayre are held annually, providing opportunities for the students' products to be sold to local people and to raise some extra funds for Pennyhooks Farm Trust.

The farm offers the students the Open College Network-accredited Countryside Stewardship Course, and assists in the transition between school and adult life by offering work-based training opportunities within a green working environment that is adapted to enable successful engagement for its students.

The owner of the farm is Lydia Otter. The Pennyhooks Project was founded in 2001 by Otter and Richard Hurford, previously a probation service officer, who now manages the farm. The decision was made to incorporate Pennyhooks Project into a charity (Pennyhooks Farm Trust) in 2011. The Autism Centre Manager, Emma Masefield, was appointed in 2018.

The Pennyhooks Farm Trust currently offers daytime student services. Planning permission has recently been given to convert farm buildings into accommodation, so that the farm can offer support to students from further afield who will be able to live on site during term-time, as needed. Fund raising has begun, so that the evolution of Pennyhooks Farm Trust can continue and more people can benefit from the skills and confidence giving experience they can gain at the farm.
