= Beckett Hall =

Country house in Shrivenham, Oxfordshire, England

Coordinates: 51.6006°N 1.6449°W

Beckett Hall (or Beckett House) is a country house at Shrivenham in the English county of Oxfordshire (formerly in Berkshire). The present house dates from 1831.

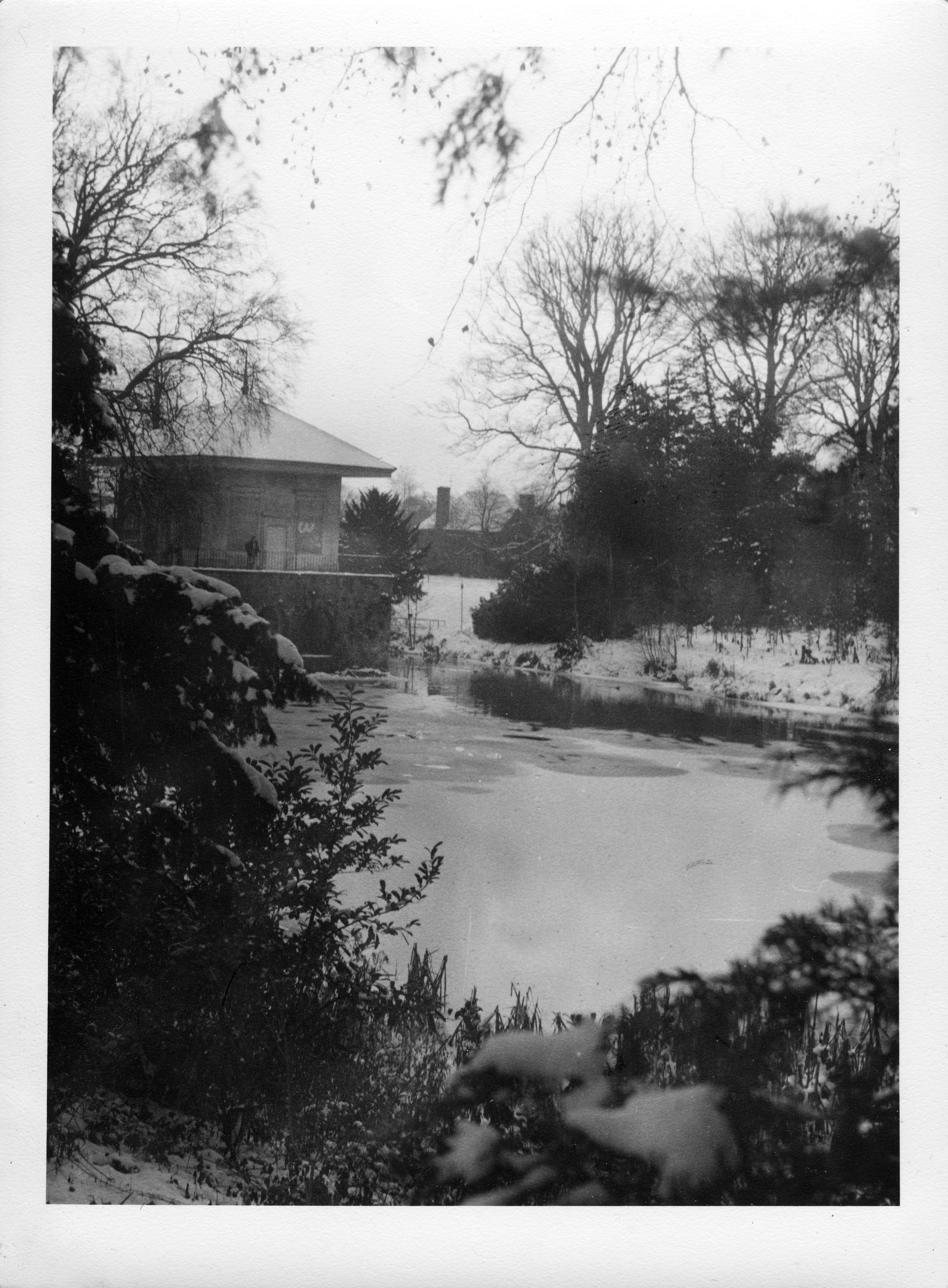
The lake and the China House, c. 1967

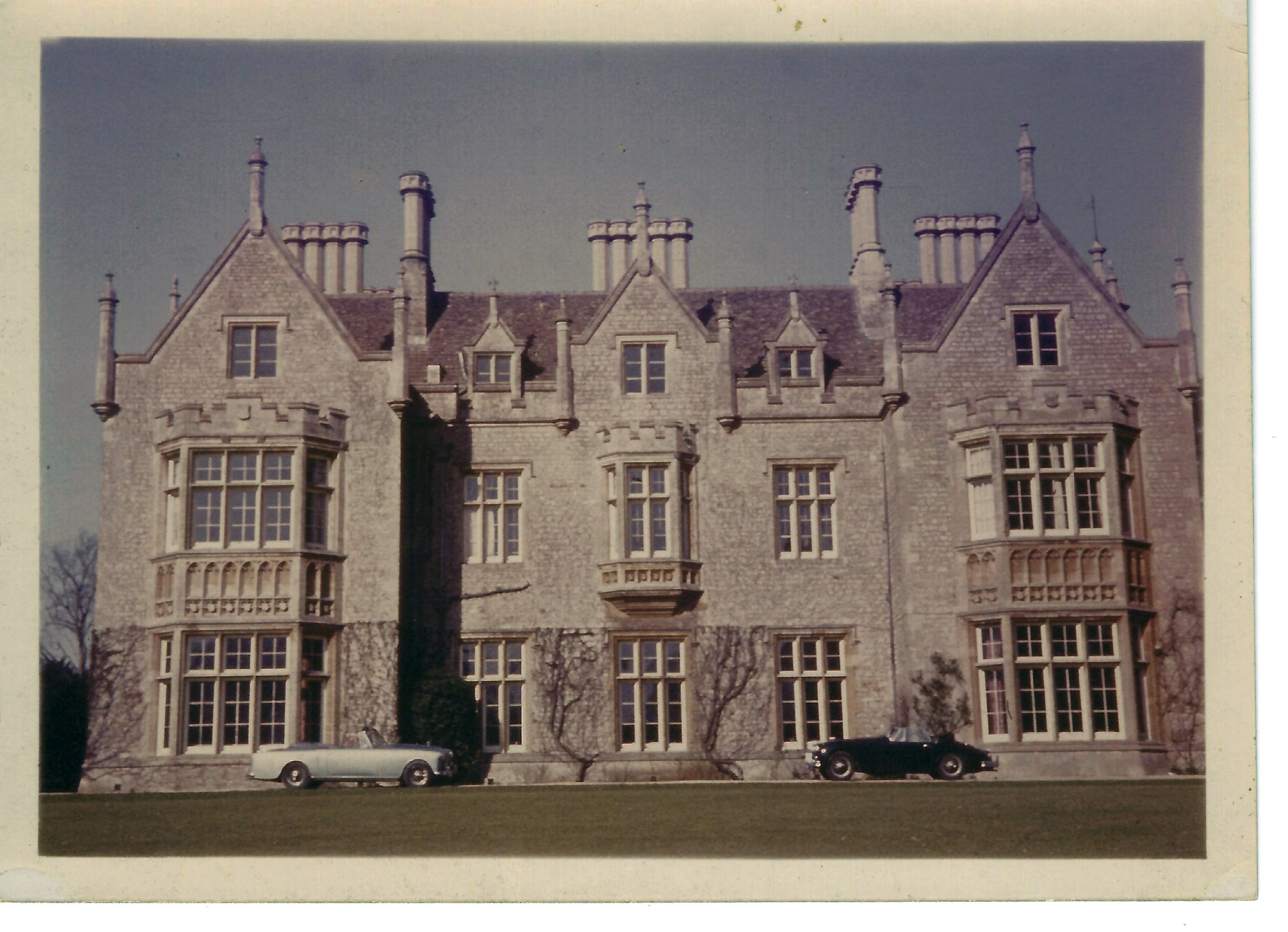
Beckett Hall in 1967

== History ==
This manor is first mentioned in the Domesday survey, and was acquired by King John in 1204.

The King holds Scrivenham in the demesne [domain] that King Edward held it. There are 46 hides. There is land for 33 ploughs. On the demesne there are 4 ploughs and there 80 villeins and 17 borderers with 30 ploughs...In the Manor are two mills worth twenty shillings, and 240 acres (0.97 km^{2}) of meadow and woodland to render 20 swine. In the time of King Edward it was worth 35 pounds, and afterwards 20, not 45 pounds.

The property was held by William, the Count of Evreux, on behalf of King John who occasionally made residence there. In return for service, King John granted ownership of the estate to the de Becote family who held the manor until 1424.

In 1633, the Manor was bought by Sir Henry Marten, a judge, then inherited by his son Henry Marten, a prominent Civil War politician and one of the regicides of King Charles I. In 1648, the house was ransacked by royalists. On the son's death, the lands were sold to Sir George Pratt.

In 1666, John Wildman bought the property. Wildman's son adopted John Shute as his heir. In 1716, John Shute was bequeathed the Barrington name by Francis Barrington and inherited the Beckett estates. He was also the recipient of a newly created Peerage of Ireland, Viscount Barrington of Ardglass. He changed his name to John Shute Barrington, and established Beckett as the family seat. The Barrington family held the estate for many years.

== House ==
The present house was built in 1830–1831 for the 6th Viscount Barrington and is near the site of an earlier large manor house which was partly burnt down during the Civil War. The first designs were by the architect William Atkinson, but were redrawn by Thomas Lidell, brother of the Viscountess. It has two storeys and attics, and is in Elizabethan revival style with mullioned windows, gabled roofs and tall chimney-stacks. The east (entrance) front and the south front have five bays, in the latter case with the two outer bays projected forward. The entrance is flanked by full-height octagonal buttresses, capped by stone cupolas. Inside are decorative plaster ceilings and fine marble fireplace surrounds, several of them from the 18th century and perhaps from the previous house. To the north are a two-storey servants' block and modern additions.

== Military use ==
In 1936, following the death the previous year of Charlotte, widow of the 9th Viscount Barrington, the hall and estate were bought by the War Office for use as an artillery training school. From 1939 it was the home of 133 Officer Cadet Training Unit, and in 1945–6 the American University for US military personnel.

In 1946, the estate became home to the Royal Military College of Science, since 2015 absorbed into the Defence Academy of the United Kingdom, and the hall served as an officers' mess, then as the college library. The college later vacated the hall, moving to a new building on the DCMT campus, and the hall became a management centre. In 2021 the building became the Armed Forces Chaplaincy Centre after their previous home at Amport House, Hampshire was vacated. A modern extension has been built providing accommodation.

== Designations ==
The house is a Grade II listed building; the China House in the grounds, traditionally seen as the work of Inigo Jones, is listed at Grade I.

== Notable residents ==
Notable residents include:

- Henry Marten – politician, regicide and resident of Beckett Hall
- John Wildman – politician and republican agitator
- John Shute Barrington, 1st Viscount Barrington – statesman and 1st Viscount Barrington, resident of Beckett Hall
- William Barrington, 2nd Viscount Barrington – politician, eldest son of John Shute Barrington
- Samuel Barrington – Admiral, fourth son of John Shute Barrington
- Shute Barrington – Bishop of Llandaff, of Salisbury and of Durham; younger son of John Shute Barrington
- Robert Whitehead – engineer, designer of the self-propelled torpedo; rented Beckett Hall in his last years and died there in 1905

== Legacy ==
The estate and the Barrington family who lived there were the inspirations for the naming of Becket, Massachusetts and Great Barrington, Massachusetts.
