= Shrivenham =

Village in Oxfordshire, England

Coordinates: 51.598°N 1.659°W

- Village and civil parish
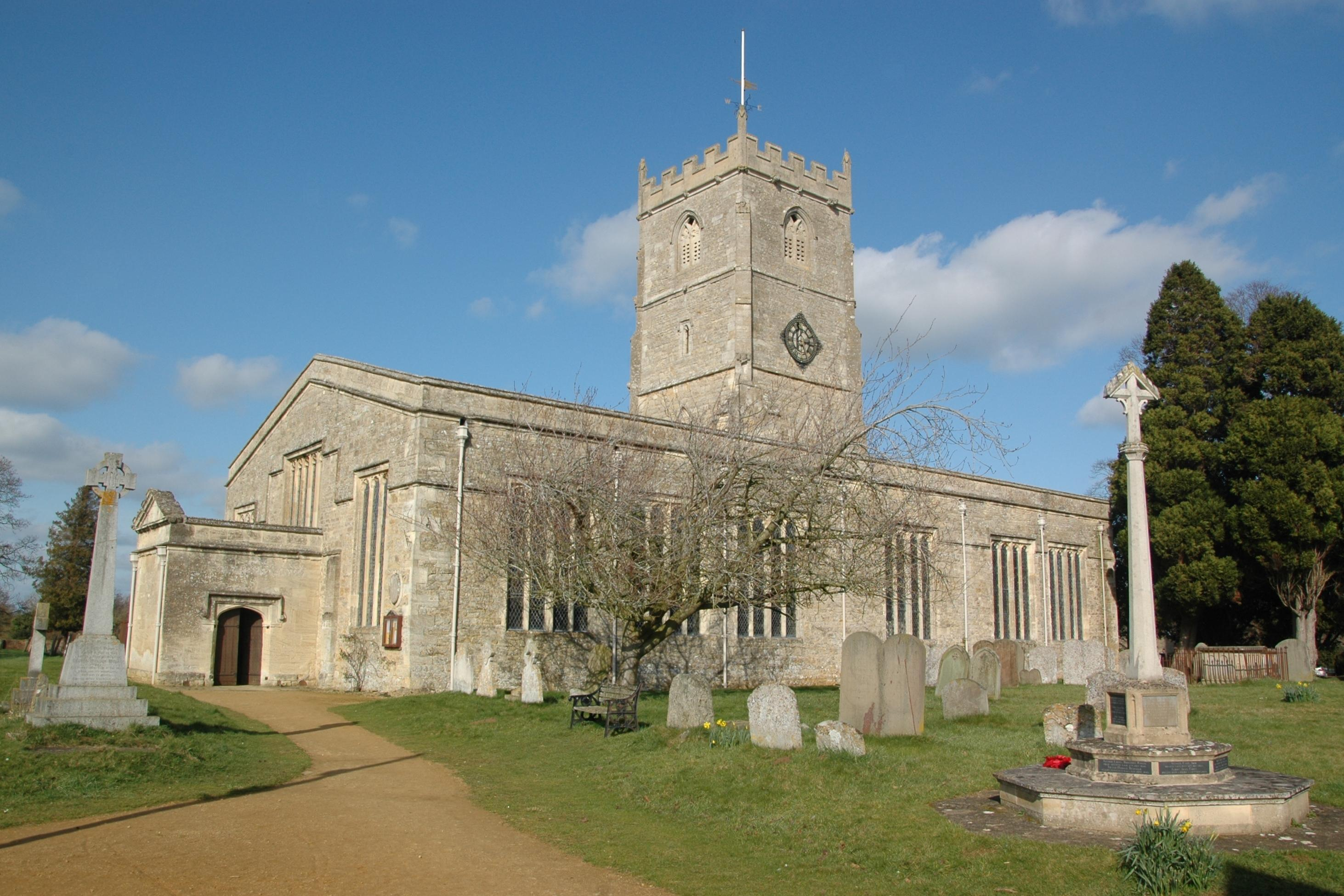
- St Andrew's parish church

- Location within Oxfordshire
- Population: 3,061 (2021)
- OS grid reference: SU2388
- District: Vale of White Horse
- Shire county: Oxfordshire
- Region: South East
- Country: England
- Sovereign state: United Kingdom
- Post town: Swindon
- Postcode district: SN6
- Dialling code: 01793
- Police: Thames Valley
- Fire: Oxfordshire
- Ambulance: South Western
- UK Parliament: Witney
- Website: Parish Council

Shrivenham is a village and civil parish in the Vale of White Horse, Oxfordshire, England, about 5 miles (8 km) south-west of Faringdon. The village is close to the county boundary with Wiltshire and about 5 miles (8 km) east-northeast of the centre of Swindon. The 2011 Census recorded the parish population as 2,347. The parish is within the historic boundaries of Berkshire; the 1974 boundary changes transferred the Vale of White Horse to Oxfordshire for administrative purposes.

== History ==
There has been human settlement at Shrivenham from at least 400 BC. The remains of a Roman villa have been uncovered nearby. Shrivenham was part of Shrivenham Hundred which included Ashbury, Buscot, Coleshill, Compton Beauchamp, Eaton Hastings, Longcot, Shrivenham, and Uffington.

Shrivenham has numerous thatched cottages, stone walls, a historic pump and a parish church that is unusual for having been rebuilt in the 17th century. The village has three historic public houses: the Barrington Arms, The Crown and the Prince of Wales.

The main country estate in Shrivenham surrounded Beckett Hall. In the 17th century it was the home of Henry Marten, the regicide. Later the Barrington family owned the estate and lived at Beckett Hall. The 6th Viscount Barrington had the present house built in 1830–1831; it is a Grade II listed building.

Charlotte, the second wife of the 9th Viscount Barrington, endowed the memorial hall in the village which was opened in 1925 by Princess Beatrice, daughter of Queen Victoria; in Cotswold Arts and Crafts style, the hall has caretaker's quarters attached. The hall and surrounding playing fields, known as Viscountess Barrington's Memorial Hall & Recreation Ground, are on Highworth Road.

== Churches ==
Shrivenham had a parish church by 1117, when Henry I granted its advowson to the Augustinian Cirencester Abbey upon the latter's foundation. Little survives from the church of that time save for part of the west wall of the nave, which is late 12th century, and the font which is carved from Purbeck Marble. By the 15th century the parish church was cruciform, with a central Perpendicular Gothic belltower that was built in about 1400. The present Church of England parish church of Saint Andrew is the result of a comprehensive and unusual rebuilding in 1638, funded largely by the Earl of Craven.

The end walls of the nave, chancel and two transepts were extended to form a rectangle with a nave of three bays with round arches on Tuscan columns with excessive entasis; a chancel of two bays; and north and south aisles running the full length of the nave, tower and chancel. The nave, chancel and aisles share one continuous roof. The central bell tower was retained in what otherwise was an almost completely new early 17th century church. A Jacobean wooden pulpit and tester and almost continuous panelling around the walls completed the interior. The building remains largely as it was completed in 1638, apart from the addition of a neoclassical west porch in the middle of the 18th century.

Inside St Andrew's are numerous monuments. The oldest is a stone recumbent effigy in the south aisle, apparently of a 14th-century woman. Many of the monuments from later centuries commemorate notable residents of Beckett Hall, including John Wildman (c. 1621– 1693), Rothesia Ann Barrington (died 1745; monument sculpted by Thomas Paty), John Barrington, 1st Viscount Barrington (1678–1734), William Barrington, 2nd Viscount Barrington (1717–1793; monument designed by James Wyatt and sculpted by Richard Westmacott) and Rear Admiral Samuel Barrington (1729–1800; monument sculpted by John Flaxman). The tower has a ring of ten bells. Mears and Stainbank of the Whitechapel Bell Foundry cast the six largest bells, including the tenor, in 1908. Gillett & Johnston of Croydon cast the third and fourth bells in 1948. These were a gift from a US Army civil affairs unit that trained in Shrivenham before the Normandy invasion. The ring was increased from eight to ten bells in 2003 when the Whitechapel Bell Foundry cast the present treble and second bells. A Primitive Methodist chapel was established in the village in 1872. It is now Shrivenham Methodist Church.

== Economic history ==
The Wilts & Berks Canal – from Semington on the Kennet and Avon Canal to Abingdon on the River Thames – was built between 1796 and 1810. In 1805 it reached Shrivenham where a wharf was built. Coal delivered via Semington to Shrivenham peaked at 601 tons in 1840, when the Great Western Railway was built through the area and opened Shrivenham station. Coal deliveries by canal fluctuated through the 1840s and then collapsed from 272 tons in 1850 to only 28 tons in 1852 and none for most years thereafter. Other canal freight also declined, and between 1893 and 1896 just 48 tons were shipped between Shrivenham and Wantage. In 1894–95 Ainsworth, a local canal carrier, handled 23 tons of freight at Shrivenham. By then the canal was increasingly in disrepair; in 1901 the collapse of the Stanley Aqueduct effectively ended the little remaining traffic, and in 1914 an Act of Parliament formalised the abandonment of the canal.

The railway station continued to serve the parish until British Railways closed it in 1964. Pennyhooks Farm Trust, begun at Pennyhooks Farm in 2001, provides development opportunities for people on the autism spectrum.

== Military sites ==
Shrivenham has been connected with military education and training since 1936, when the Beckett estate was sold to the War Office following the death of Charlotte Barrington the previous year.

A training establishment was built north-east of Beckett Hall. At the outbreak of war in 1939 the 133rd Officer Cadet Training Unit was established here, one of six OCTUs created to meet the increased demand. Shrivenham specialised in anti-aircraft artillery, and after an improvised start, the course length was standardised at six months. At some point the main buildings gained names such as Marlborough Hall and Wellington Hall.

=== GI American University ===
At the end of World War II in Europe, the US Army's Information and Educational Branch was ordered to establish an overseas university campus for demobilised American service men and women. From 1945 to 1946, Shrivenham American University was housed at the Beckett Hall site. This, and two other campuses in Europe, was set up to provide a transition between army life and subsequent attendance at a university in the USA, and therefore students attended for just one term.

=== Since 1946 ===
The Royal Military College of Science (RMCS) moved into the establishment in 1946, having been dispersed across three sites during the war. In 2015 the college was absorbed into the Defence Academy of the United Kingdom. The academy provides higher education for personnel in the British Armed Forces, Civil Service, other government departments and service personnel from other nations. The academy is headquartered at Shrivenham and delivers education and training in a number of sites. The majority of training is postgraduate with many courses being accredited for the award of civilian qualifications. The Conflict Studies Research Centre (CSRC) is just over the parish boundary in Watchfield.

Joint Services Command and Staff College (JSCSC) is a military academic establishment providing training and education to experienced officers of the Royal Navy, British Army, Royal Air Force, Ministry of Defence Civil Service, and serving officers of other states. JSCSC combined the single service provision of the British Armed Forces: Royal Naval College, Greenwich, Staff College, Camberley, RAF Staff College, Bracknell and the Joint Service Defence College, Greenwich. Initially formed at Bracknell in 1997, the college moved to a purpose-built facility in the grounds of the Defence Academy in 2000.

Since 2020, Beckett House has been the home of the tri-service Armed Forces Chaplaincy Centre. A new building for the Royal Army Chaplains' Museum opened there in 2022.

Defence Futures (formerly the Development, Concepts and Doctrine Centre), the MOD's independent think tank, is also in the area.

Between 2005 and 2010, the Conflict Studies Research Centre (CSRC) was part of the UK Defence Academy. It specialised in potential causes of conflict in a wide area ranging from the Baltic to Central Asia. This geographical focus was inherited from the centre's original incarnation as the Soviet Studies Research Centre (SSRC) in 1972, at Royal Military Academy Sandhurst, examining the Soviet military threat. Renamed in the 1990s, the body later examined wider issues including foreign policy, energy security and demographic change.

== In literature ==
In Tom Brown's School Days, the main character Tom Brown mentions Shrivenham railway station (now closed):

"Most of you have probably travelled down the Great Western Railway as far as Swindon. Those of you who did so with their eyes open have been aware, soon after leaving the Didcot station, of a fine range of chalk hills running parallel with the railway on the left-hand side as you go down, and distant some two or three miles, more or less, from the line. The highest point in the range is the White Horse Hill, which you come in front of just before you stop at the Shrivenham station. If you love English scenery, and have a few hours to spare, you can't do better, the next time you pass, than stop at the Farringdon Road or Shrivenham station, and make your way to that highest point."

== Sport and leisure ==
The local football team is Shrivenham F.C. The Vale of White Horse Gliding Centre flies from Sandhill Farm, just north of the village.

An 18-hole golf course is just outside the village.

== Notable people ==
- John Shute Barrington, 1st Viscount Barrington (1678–1734), statesman; resident of Beckett Hall
- Samuel Barrington (1729–1800), Royal Navy rear admiral, fourth son of John Shute Barrington
- Shute Barrington, (1734–1826), Bishop of Llandaff, of Salisbury and of Durham
- William Barrington, 2nd Viscount Barrington (1717–1793), politician, eldest son of John Shute Barrington
- John Lamb (1858–1949), surveyor, civil engineer and architect based in Nottingham
- Henry Marten (1602–1680), politician, regicide; resident of Beckett Hall
- Nicholas Sambourn (1394–1395), MP for Chippenham and Malmesbury
- John Wildman (c.1621–1693), politician and Postmaster General; resident of Beckett Hall

== Twin town ==
- Mortrée, a commune with some 1,000 inhabitants in Lower Normandy, France, has been twinned with Shrivenham since 1988.

== Gallery ==
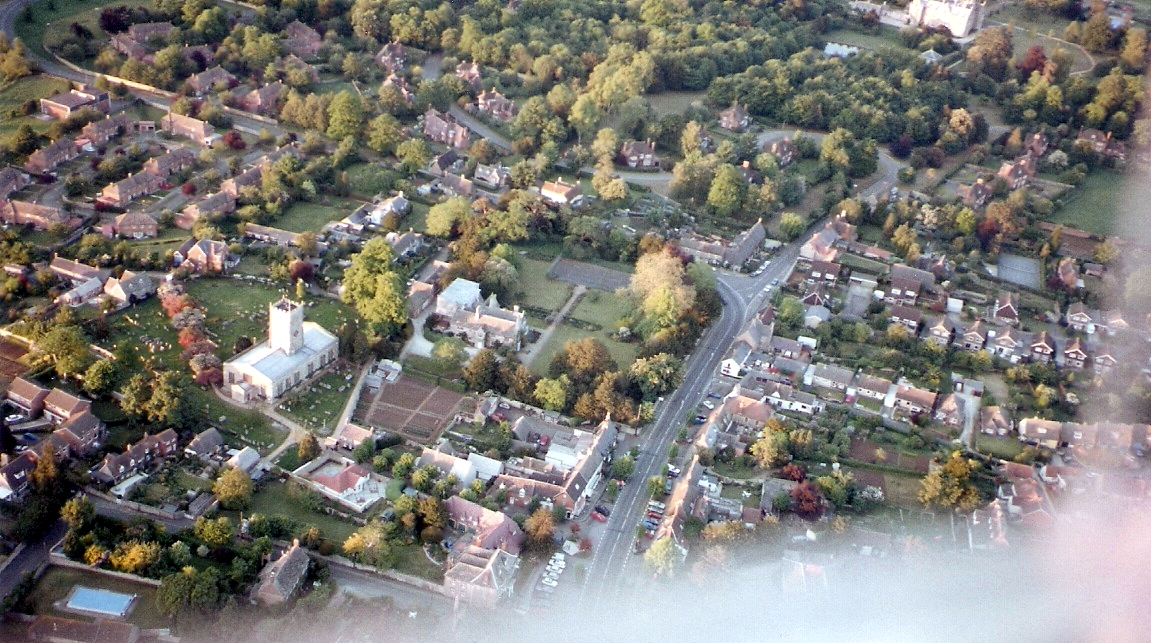
Aerial view of Shrivenham showing St Andrew's parish church

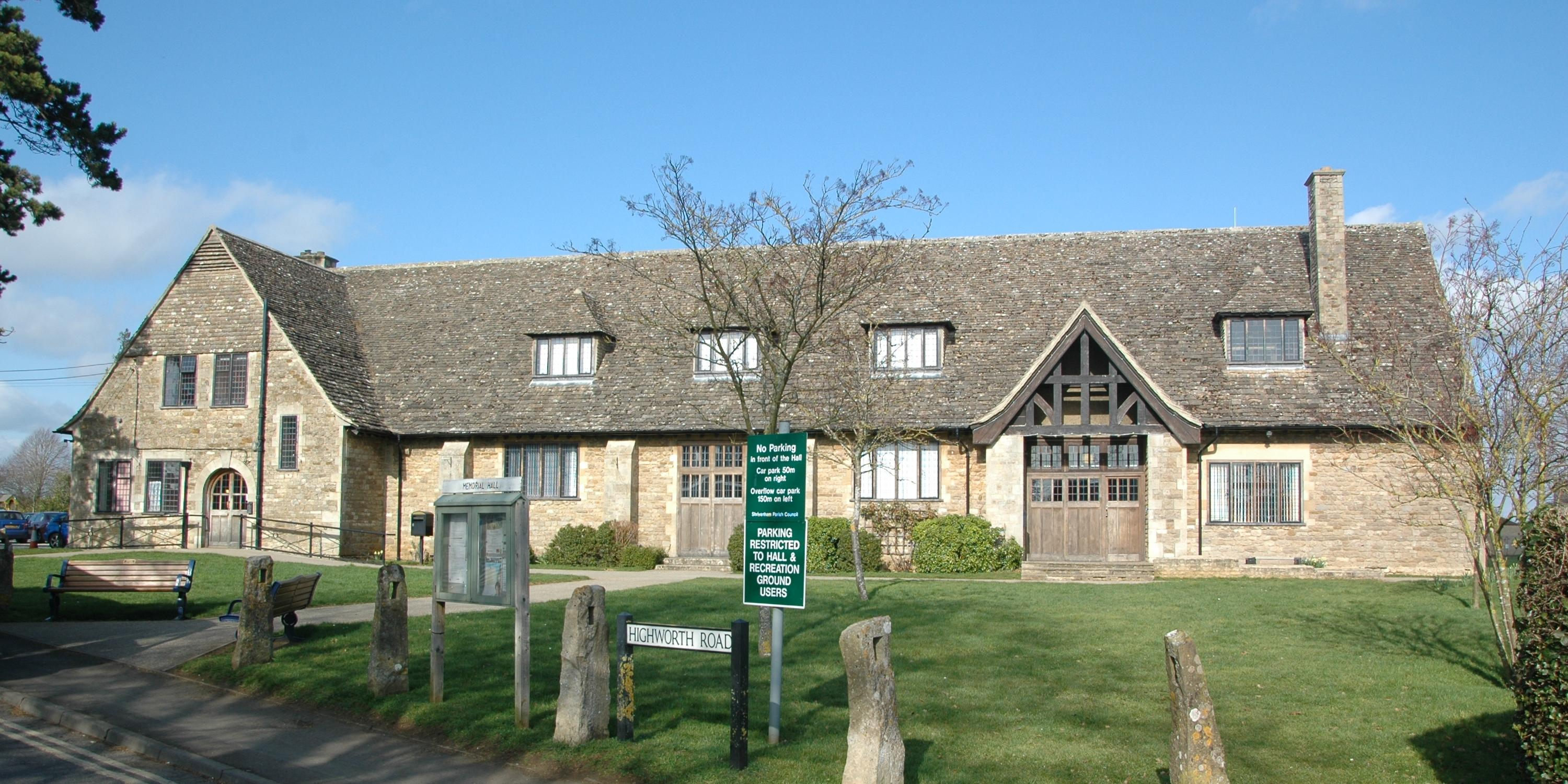
Shrivenham Memorial Hall in Highworth Road was built in the 1920s

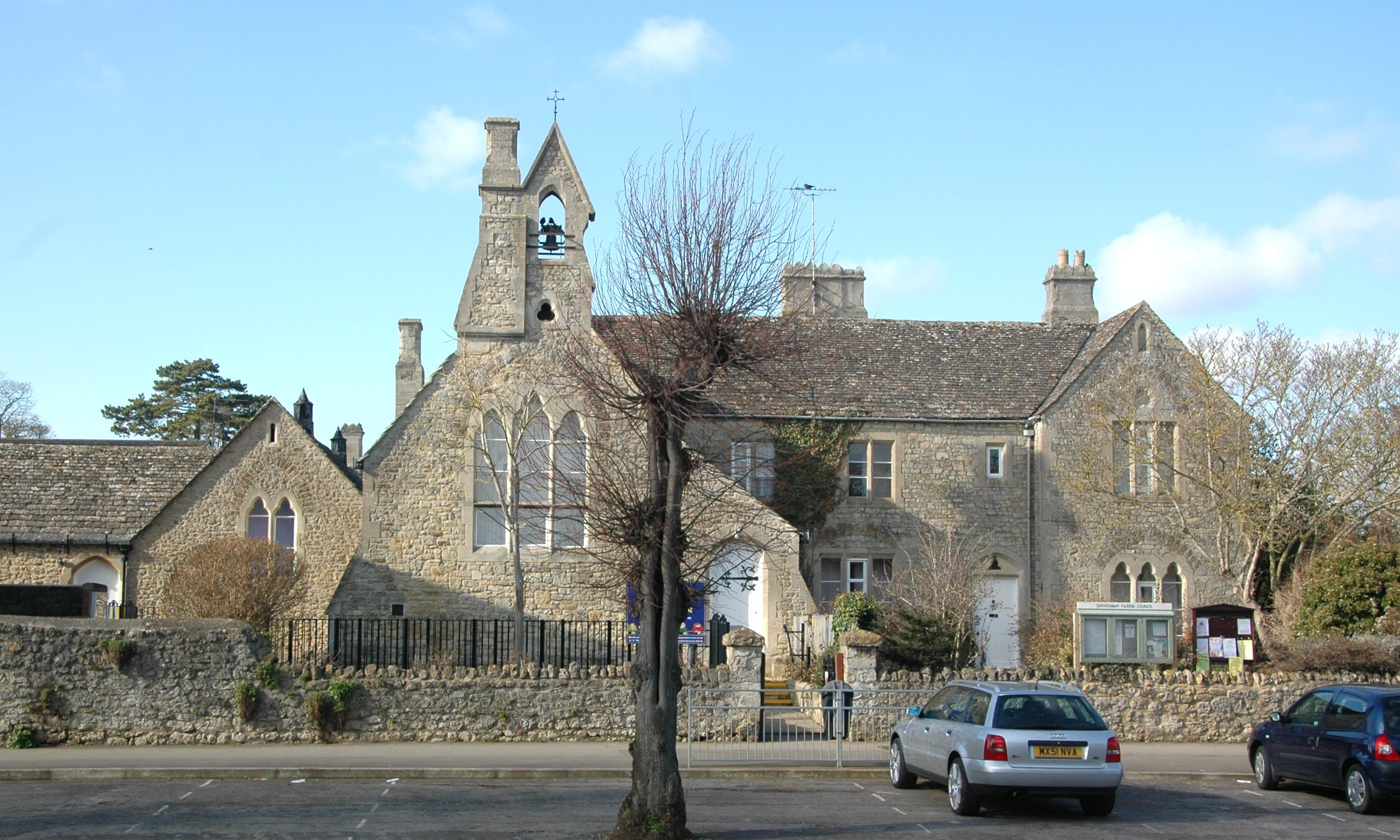
St. Andrew's Church of England Controlled Primary School was built as a National School in 1863

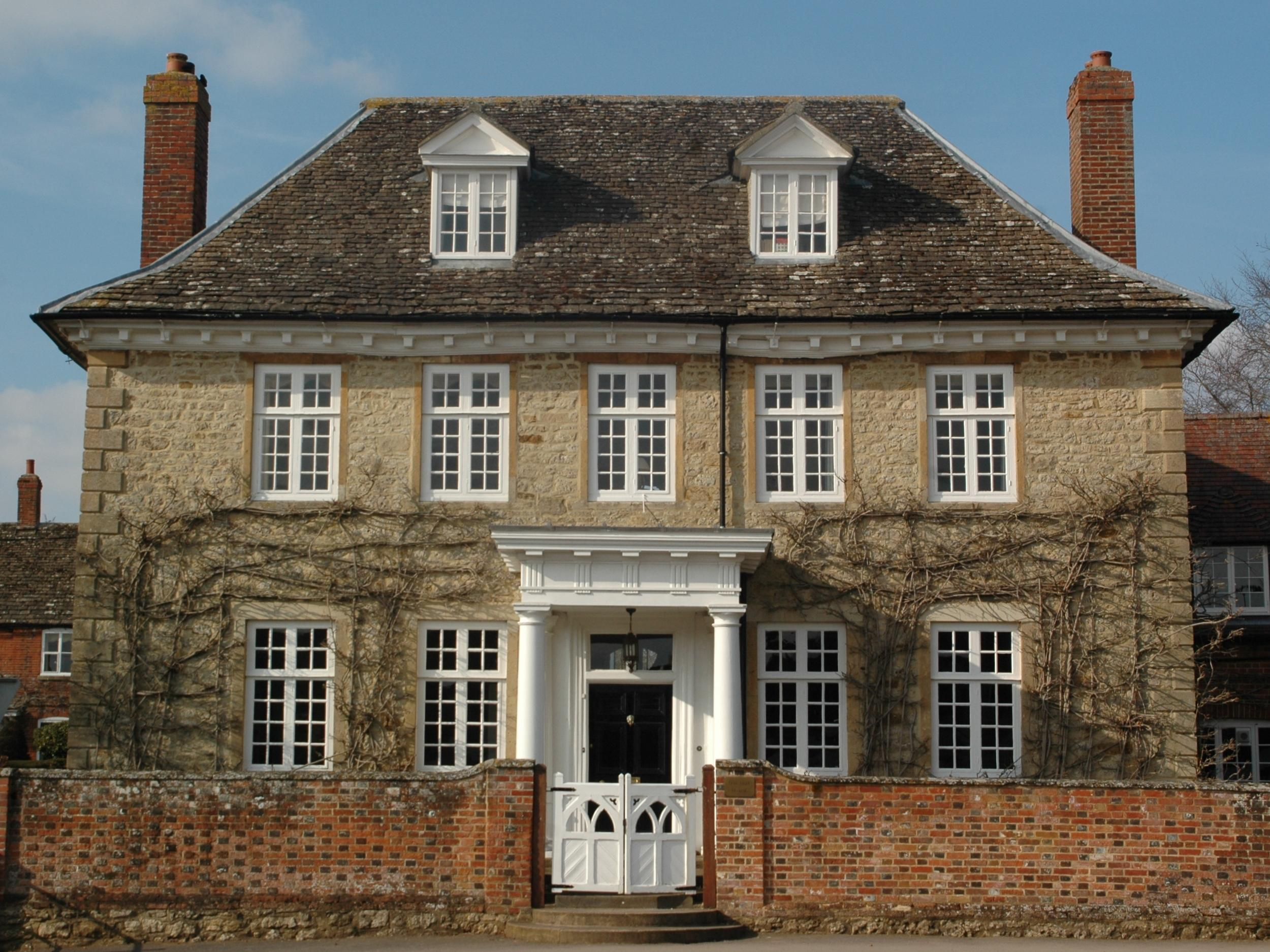
Elm Tree House, built of the local stone in about 1700, with Tuscan porch added later

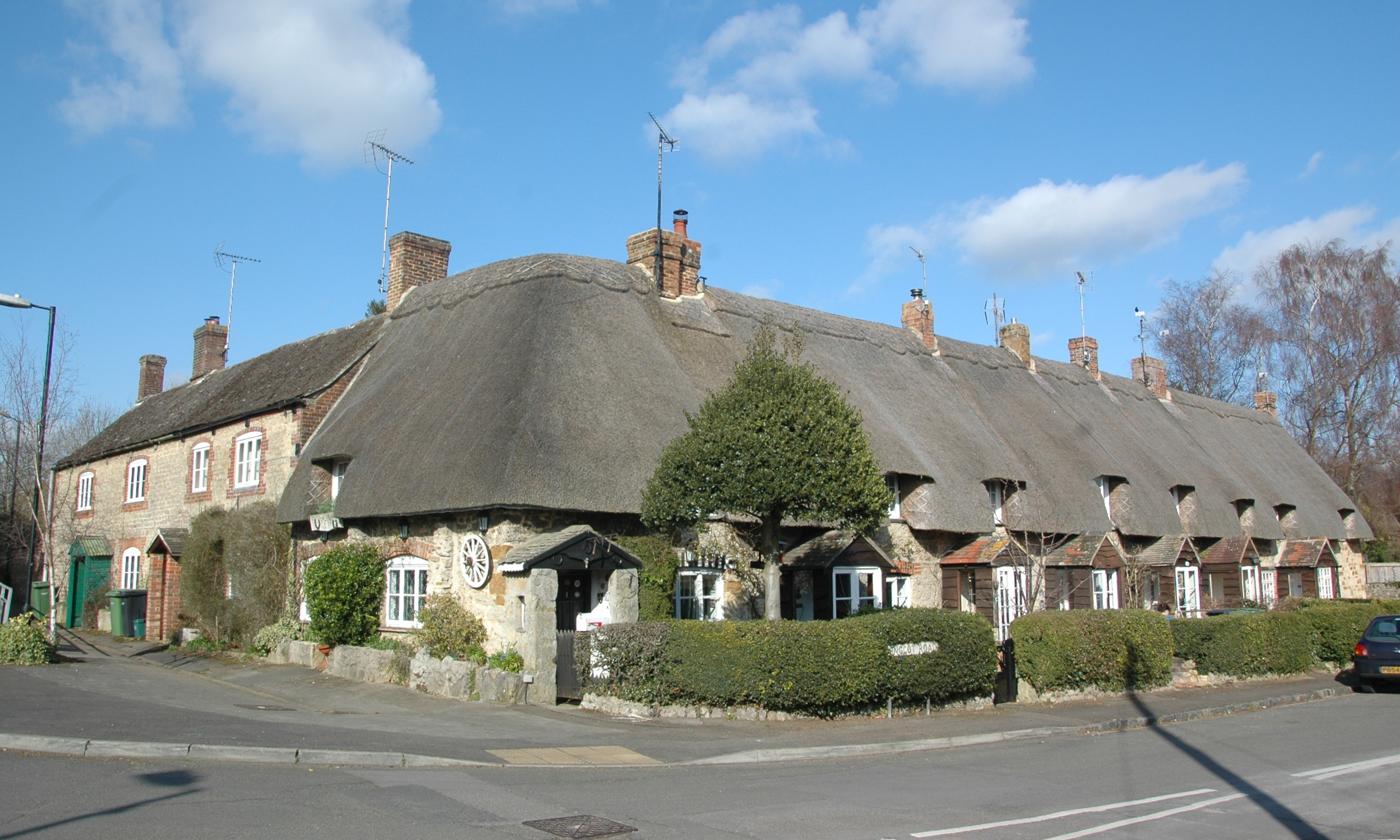
Late 17th or early 18th century thatched cottages in Longcot Road

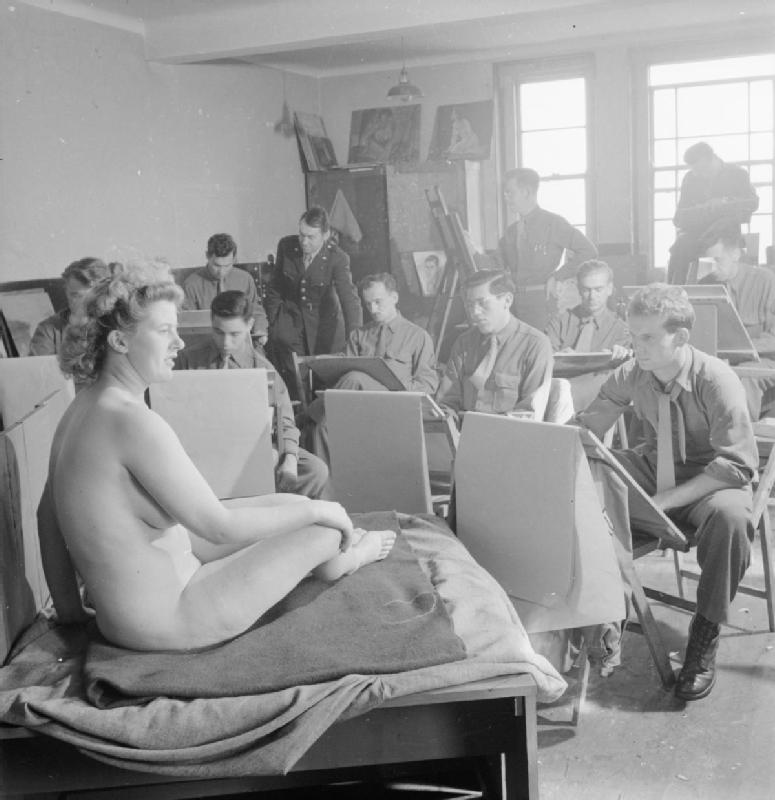
Students take part in a life drawing class at the US Army University, 1945

== Bibliography ==
- Boobyer, David (2005). Shrivenham: Portraits of a Typical English Village.
- Child, Mark (2007). Guide to St Andrew's Church Shrivenham In The Diocese of Oxford. Thanet: The Church Publishers.
- Dalby, L. J. (2000) [1971]. The Wilts and Berks Canal (3rd ed.). Usk: Oakwood Press. pp. 23, 119, 123, 124. ISBN 0-85361-562-4.
- Dils, Joan; Schwartz, Deidre (2004). Tudor and Stuart Shrivenham. self-published by the authors.
- Hill, Rev. Edward Frank (1929). A Record of the Parish of Shrivenham, Berkshire. Faringdon: C Luker.
- Laird, Philip (2007). Shrivenham: A Local Place for Local People.
- Page, William; Ditchfield, PH, eds. (1924). A History of the County of Berkshire. Victoria County History. Vol. IV. assisted by John Hautenville Cope. London: The St Katherine Press. pp. 531–543.
- Pevsner, Nikolaus (1966). Berkshire. The Buildings of England. Harmondsworth: Penguin Books. pp. 217–218.
