= John Barrington, 1st Viscount Barrington =

English theologian and politician (1678–1734)

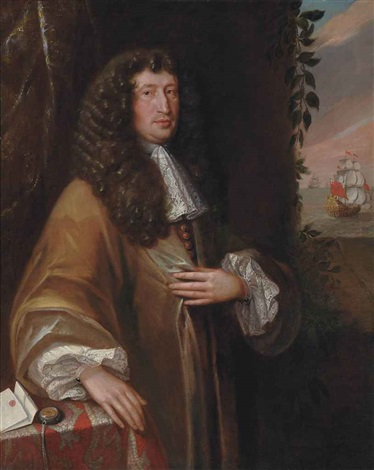
Portrait, circle of John Michael Wright

John Barrington, 1st Viscount Barrington (1678 – 14 December 1734), known as John Shute until 1710, was an English dissenting theologian and Whig politician who sat in the House of Commons from 1715 to 1723.

== Background and education ==
Barrington was born as John Shute at Theobalds House, near Cheshunt, Hertfordshire, the son of Benjamin Shute, a merchant, and his wife Elizabeth, daughter of dissenting preacher Rev. Joseph Caryll. He received part of his education at the University of Utrecht between 1694 and 1698 and, after returning to England, studied law in the Inner Temple.

== Career ==
Barrington's Name Act 1716
- Act of Parliament
- Parliament of Great Britain
- Long title: An Act to enable John Barrington, alias Shute, Esquire, and his Issue Male, to change their Surname to Barrington, according to the Settlement of Francis Barrington Esquire, deceased.
- Citation: 3 Geo. 1. c. 8 Pr.
- Territorial extent: Great Britain

Dates
- Royal assent: 22 June 1717
- Commencement: 21 November 1717 (Note: Start of session.)

Status: Current legislation

Barrington was a Dissenter and in 1701 published several pamphlets in favour of the civil rights of Protestant dissenters. On the recommendation of Lord Somers he was employed to encourage the Presbyterians in Scotland to support the union of the two kingdoms, and in 1708 he was rewarded for this service by being appointed to the office of commissioner of the customs. He was removed from this position on the change of administration in 1711. In the meantime he had benefitted from the bequest to him of two considerable estates. One was left by a distant family connection, Francis Barrington of Tofts, whose name he assumed in 1710, and then formally took by a private act of Parliament, Barrington's Name Act 1716 (3 Geo. 1. c. 8 Pr.); and the other by an admirer John Wildman of Beckett Hall at Shrivenham, Berkshire (now Oxfordshire). Barrington was now one of the leading dissenters.

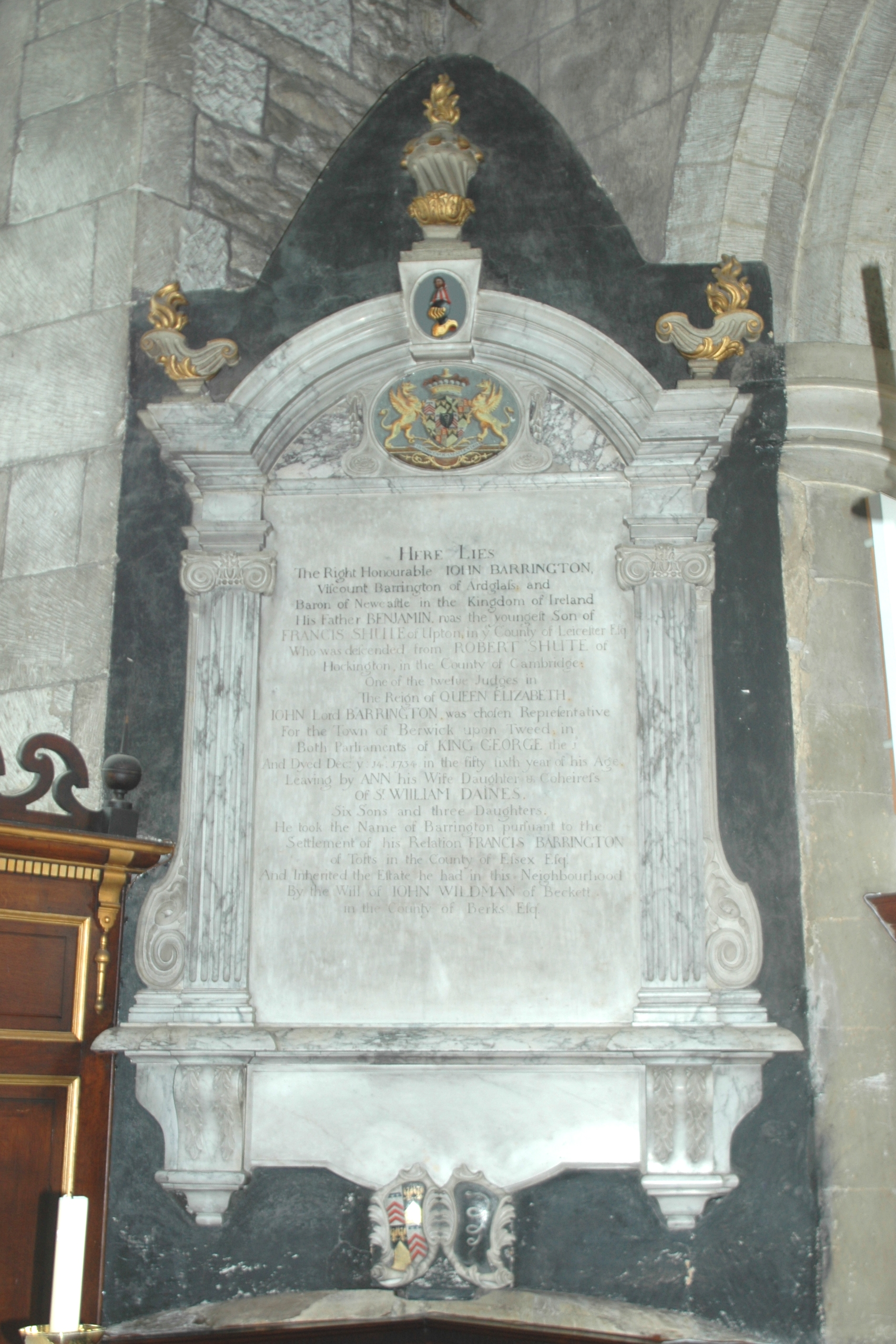
Monument to John Barrington in St. Andrew's parish church, Shrivenham, in the Vale of White Horse.

At the 1715 general election Barrington was returned unopposed as Member of Parliament for Berwick-upon-Tweed with another dissenter Grey Neville. In 1720 the King raised him to the Irish peerage as Baron Barrington, of Newcastle in the County of Limerick, and Viscount Barrington, of Ardglass in the County of Down. He was re-elected as MP for Berwick in a contest at the 1722 general election.

Barrington had become sub-governor of the Harburg Company, which was founded to conduct trade between Great Britain and Hanover. The company had authority to raise capital by lottery at Harburg and Barrington's role was to obtain approval from Parliament to hold the lottery in England. Although he was told by Walpole and others that it was illegal and imprudent, the lottery went ahead. A parliamentary committee was set up to investigate, condemned the undertaking and concluded that Barrington had been guilty of "promoting, abetting, and carrying on a fraudulent undertaking". As a result, he was expelled from the House of Commons in 1723. Some considered the punishment much too severe, and was thought to be due to Walpole's personal malice.

In 1725, Barrington published his principal work, entitled Miscellanea Sacra or a New Method of considering so much of the History of the Apostles as is contained in Scripture,—afterwards reprinted with additions and corrections, in 1770, by his son Shute. In the same year he published An Essay on the Several Dispensations of God to Mankind.

Barrington stood again at Berwick at the 1727 general election and was defeated. He was confident of winning at the 1734 election, but Walpole decided to work against him. In the event Barrington lost by four votes.

== Death and legacy ==
Barrington died on 14 December 1734. He married Anne Daines, daughter of Sir William Daines, in 1713. Their five sons all gained distinction.

- William, the eldest, became Chancellor of the Exchequer;
- John was a major-general in the British Army;
- Daines was a lawyer, antiquarian and naturalist;
- Samuel was an admiral in the Royal Navy;
- Shute became Bishop of Salisbury and Bishop of Durham.

Their daughter Anne married the Hon. Thomas Clarges, son of Sir Thomas Clarges.

== Notes ==
Parliament of Great Britain
Preceded by Richard Hampden; William Orde	Member of Parliament for Berwick-upon-Tweed; 1715–1723; With: Grey Neville	Succeeded by Grey Neville; Henry Grey
Peerage of Ireland
New creation	Viscount Barrington; 1720–1734	Succeeded by William Barrington
