= Florentius Vassall =

Florentius Vassall (1689–1778) was a wealthy planter and slave-owner in Jamaica. The Jamaican quit rent books for 1754 show that he owned 2,700 acres of land in Saint James Parish, 3,714 acres in Westmoreland Parish, and 1,943 acres in Saint Elizabeth Parish, a total 8,357 acres.

He had a garden at his house in Westmoreland, his usual residence when in Jamaica, for which he imported plants from England.

His son Richard Vassall was father of Elizabeth Fox, Baroness Holland, wife firstly of Sir Godfrey Webster, 4th Baronet, from whom she was divorced, and secondly of Henry Vassall-Fox, 3rd Baron Holland.
