= Samuel Barrington =

Royal Navy officer (1729–1800)

Admiral Samuel Barrington
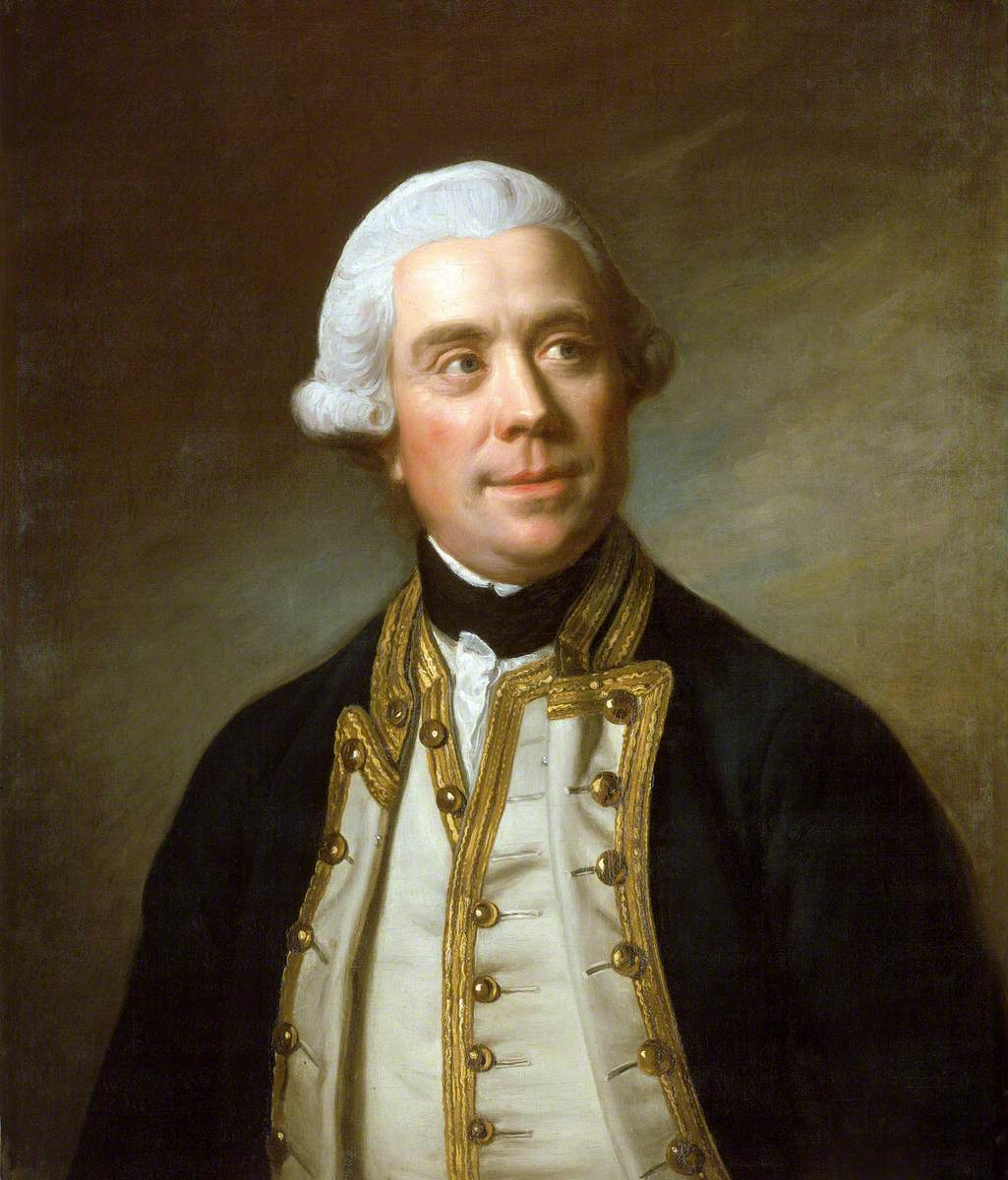
- Portrait by Nathaniel Dance-Holland, c. 1770
- Born: 1729
- Died: 16 August 1800
- Relatives: John Shute Barrington, 1st Viscount Barrington (father)
- Military career
- Allegiance: Great Britain
- Branch: Royal Navy
- Service years: 1740–1800
- Rank: Admiral of the White
- Commands: HMS Weazel; HMS Bellona; HMS Romney; HMS Seahorse; HMS Crown; HMS Norwich; HMS Achilles; HMS Hero; HMS Venus; HMS Albion; HMS Prince of Wales; Leeward Islands Station; Channel Fleet
- Conflicts: War of the Austrian Succession; Battle of Saint-Louis-du-Sud; Seven Years' War; Raid on Rochefort; Action of 29 April 1758; Raid on Le Havre; Capture of Belle Île; Falklands Crisis of 1770; American Revolutionary War; Battle of St. Lucia; Battle of Grenada; Battle of Ushant (1782); Great Siege of Gibraltar; Battle of Cape Spartel

Admiral of the White Samuel Barrington (1729—16 August 1800) was a Royal Navy officer. Barrington was the fourth son of John Barrington, 1st Viscount Barrington of Beckett Hall at Shrivenham in Berkshire (now Oxfordshire). He enlisted in the navy at the age of 11, and by 1747 had been promoted to post-captain. Barrington enlisted in the Royal Navy at the age of 11 and was promoted to post-captain by 1747, aided in part by his family's political connections.

== Life ==
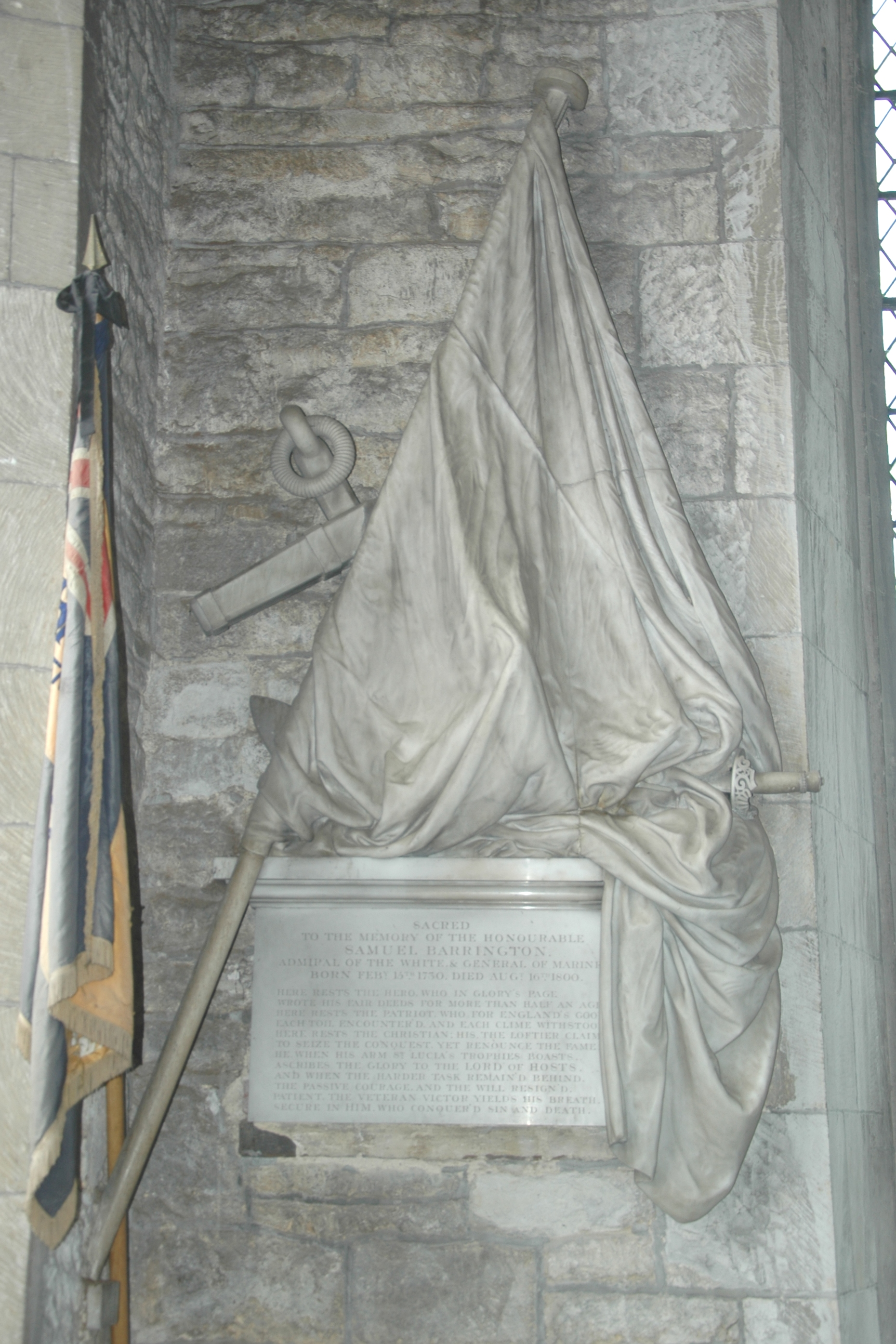
Marble monument by John Flaxman to Barrington in St Andrew's Church, Shrivenham

=== Early career ===
Barrington went to sea in 1740. By 1745 he had passed the examination making him eligible for promotion to lieutenant. He was promoted to that rank in October 1746. His elder brother William, Viscount Barrington, was then a junior Admiralty lord, and pestered the First Lord of the Admiralty, the civilian John Russell, Duke of Bedford, to promote Samuel to the rank of master and commander, which was done in November. Next year, at the age of eighteen, he was made post-captain.

=== Seven Years' War ===
He was in continuous service during the peace of 1748–56, and on the outbreak of the Seven Years' War served with Admiral Edward Hawke in the Basque Roads in command of HMS Achilles. In 1759 Achilles captured a powerful French privateer, after two hours' fighting. In the Havre-de-Grace expedition of the same year Barrington's ship carried the flag of Rear-Admiral George Brydges Rodney, and in 1760 sailed with John Byron to destroy the French Fortress of Louisbourg in Nova Scotia. At the peace in 1763 Barrington had been almost continuously afloat for twenty-two years.

He was appointed in 1768 to the frigate HMS Venus as governor to the Duke of Cumberland, who remained with him in all ranks from midshipman to rear admiral. Between 1772 and 1775 he accompanied Captain John Jervis to Russia where they spent time in St Petersburg and inspected the arsenal and dockyards at Kronstadt, and took a tour of the yacht designed by Sir Charles Knowles for Catherine the Great. The pair continued on to Sweden, Denmark and northern Germany. All the while Jervis and Barrington made notes on defences, harbour charts and safe anchorages. They came home via the Netherlands, the two once again making extensive studies of the area and taking copious notes describing any useful information.

=== American Revolutionary War ===
In 1778 Barrington became commander-in-chief of the Leeward Islands Station. While in post he organised the construction of Fort Barrington in Montserrat to enhance the defences of the capital Plymouth. Barrington and Jervis then took a private cruise along the Channel coast calling at various harbours including Brest and making and improving their charts as they went. Barrington and Jervis, later Earl St. Vincent remained firm friends throughout their lives.

On his return home, Barrington was offered, but declined, the command of the Channel fleet. He accepted the position of second in command of the fleet, under Admiral Francis Geary, in May 1780. The fleet patrolled far into the Atlantic, ensuring the safety of British convoys, preventing a junction of the opposing French and Spanish fleets, and capturing twelve merchant ships from a French convoy. The extended cruise caused an outbreak of scurvy and the fleet returned to England in August. Geary went ashore sick and Barrington assumed command. The Admiralty ordered him to return to sea with the fleet. Barrington refused to obey, which was seen as at least partially motivated by political machinations, and he was relieved of command.

After a change of government, Barrington was again appointed second in command of the Channel Fleet in 1782, this time under Admiral Richard Howe. After a summer of manoeuvring, mostly against the Spanish, the fleet sailed to relieve the siege of Gibraltar on 11 September. After successfully resupplying the garrison the British fleet of 35 ships of the line encountered a Spanish force of 46 ships. After some inconclusive skirmishing the British were able to evade them and returned to port. The war ended in February 1783.

Barrington was promoted to Admiral of the White on 24 September 1787 and was recalled to active service for a period in 1790 as a result of the Nootka Crisis between Britain and Spain. However, he did not see active service in the French Revolutionary Wars and died on 16 August 1800.

== Legacy ==
In 1794, James Colnett named one of the Galapagos Islands after Barrington, a name it maintained for centuries before being formally renamed Santa Fe Island.

== See also ==
- * The Barrington papers: selected from the letters and papers of Admiral the Hon. Samuel Barrington, edited by David Bonner-Smith. Publications of the Navy Records Society, vols. 77, 81. ([London]: Printed for the Navy Records Society, 1937–41).

Military offices
Preceded by James Young	Commander-in-Chief, Leeward Islands Station; 1778–1779	Succeeded by John Byron
