= Shute Barrington =

18th and 19th-century Anglican bishop in Britain

The Right Reverend Shute Barrington
- Bishop of Durham
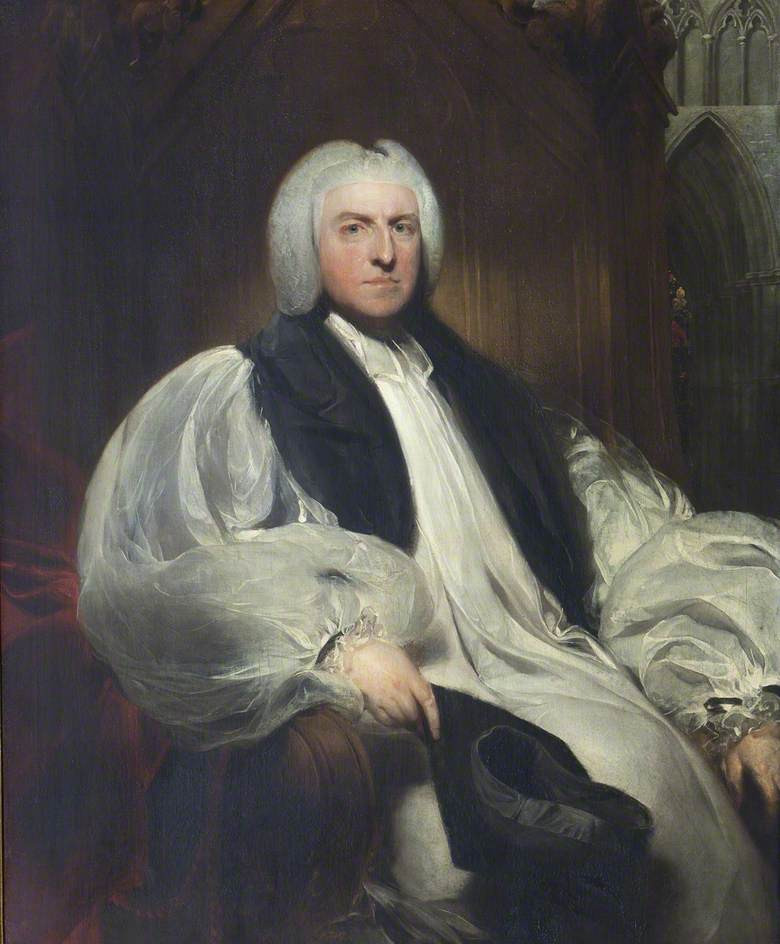
- Portrait by Thomas Lawrence
- Diocese: Diocese of Durham
- In office: 1791–1826
- Predecessor: Thomas Thurlow
- Successor: William Van Mildert
- Other posts: Bishop of Salisbury & ex officio Chancellor of the Garter (1782–1791); Bishop of Llandaff (1769–1782)

Orders
- Ordination: 1756 (deacon)
- Consecration: 1769

Personal details
- Born: 26 May 1734 Beckett Hall, Berkshire, Great Britain
- Died: 25 March 1826 (aged 91) Soho, Middlesex, United Kingdom
- Buried: St John the Baptist's Church, Mongewell
- Denomination: Anglicanism
- Residence: Mongewell Park, Oxfordshire (personal)
- Parents: John & Anne
- Spouse: 1. Diana (m. 1761–1766); 2. Jane (m. 1770–1807)
- Education: Eton College; Merton College, Oxford

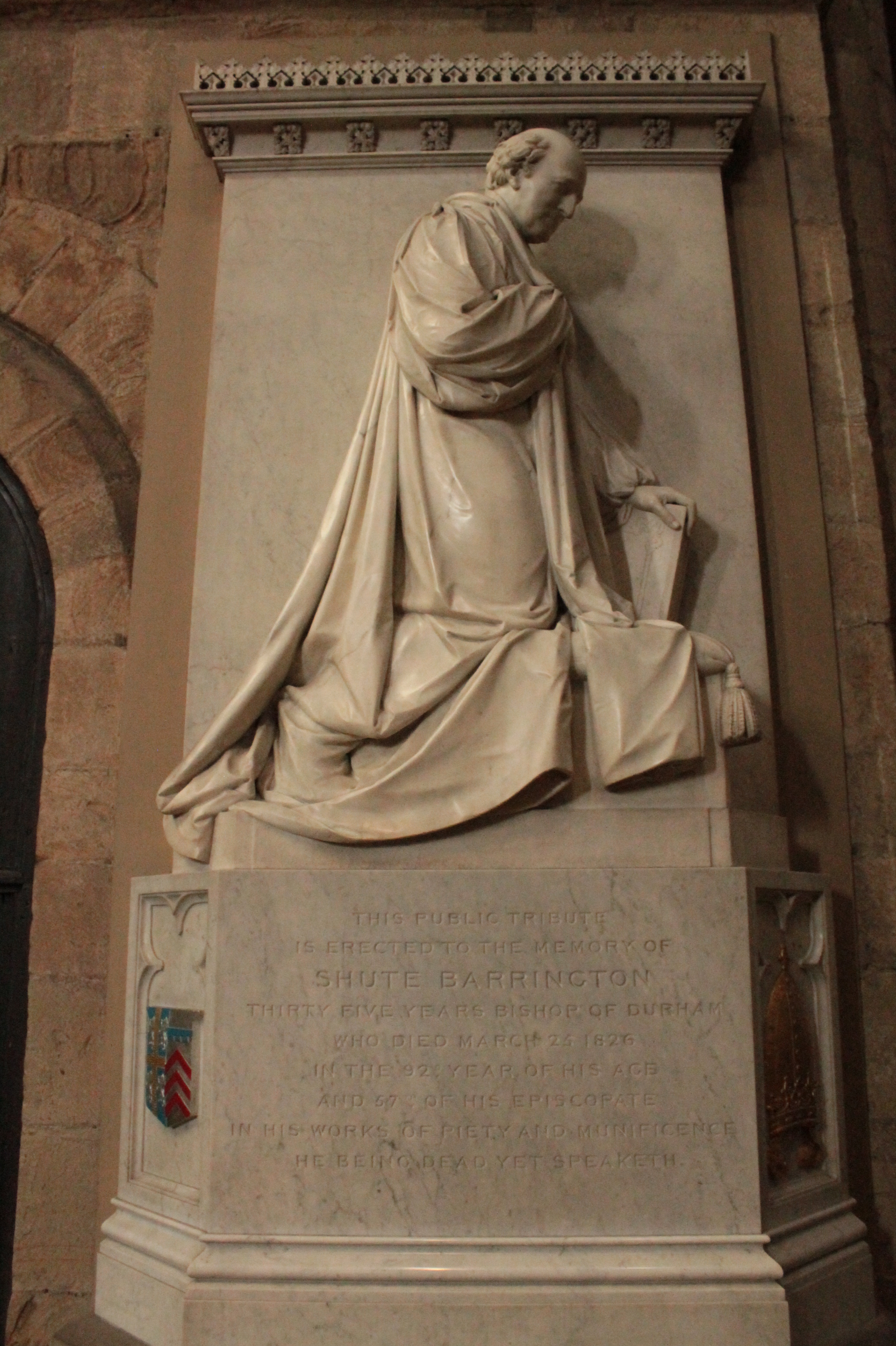
Memorial to Barrington at Durham Cathedral

Shute Barrington (26 May 1734 – 25 March 1826) was an English churchman, Bishop of Llandaff in Wales, as well as Bishop of Salisbury and Bishop of Durham in England.

== Early life ==
Barrington was born at Beckett Hall in Shrivenham in Berkshire (now Oxfordshire), the home of his father, John Barrington, 1st Viscount Barrington and mother, Anne (née Daines), and educated at Eton College and Merton College, Oxford.

== Church career ==
Barrington was ordained a deacon by Thomas Secker, Bishop of Oxford, on 28 November 1756 at St Aldate's Church, Oxford; he was presumably ordained a priest within a year. In 1761 he was a made a canon of Christ Church, Oxford and in 1768 a canon of St Paul's from where he moved to be a canon at St George's Chapel, Windsor. In 1769 he was elevated to the episcopate as Bishop of Llandaff; his election was confirmed on 23 September and he was consecrated a bishop on 1 October at Lambeth Palace chapel by Frederick Cornwallis, Archbishop of Canterbury (assisted by Richard Terrick, Bishop of London, and Zachary Pearce, Bishop of Rochester.) He was elected on 14 August 1782 to become Bishop of Salisbury, and was translated to that see upon the confirmation of that election on 27 August at St Mary le Bow. As Bishop of Salisbury he was also ex officio Chancellor of the Order of the Garter. He was further translated to be Bishop of Durham following his election on 25 June 1791.

Barrington was a vigorous Protestant, though willing to grant Roman Catholics "every degree of toleration short of political power and establishment." He published several volumes of sermons and tracts, and wrote the political life of his elder brother, William Barrington. From 1805 to 1826 he was the Visitor of Balliol College, Oxford and in 1806 backed the then Master, John Parsons, in opening the Fellowships to competition. On 5 February 1807, during a debate in the House of Lords over the proposed Slave Trade Act 1807, Barrington spoke in support of the act and claimed that the Atlantic slave trade was "wholly inconsistent with the spirit of the Christian religion".

Barrington was a great patron of architecture and education in the diocese of Durham. One school, Bishop Barrington Academy, still exists today in Bishop Auckland. To mark his fiftieth year in the prelacy, the diocese of Durham built the Clergy Jubilee School in Newcastle and arranged that Dame Allan's Schools should be housed there. In architecture he employed James Wyatt to remodel Salisbury Cathedral, as well as the Georgian Gothic interiors of Auckland Castle, his favoured residence. Barrington was also a primary litigant in Morice v Bishop of Durham (1805)10 Ves 522, which is a leading case on the conditions necessary to form a trust in English law.

Barrington had an extensive correspondence with the West Indies expert Colonel Thomas Moody ADC Kt., who named one of his sons, Shute Barrington Moody (1818-1851), after Shute Barrington. He died in Soho in Middlesex (now Greater London). He is buried at St John the Baptist's Church, near his home at Mongewell Park, close to Wallingford, Oxfordshire.

== Memorials ==
A fine marble monument was erected to Barrington's memory in Durham Cathedral sculpted by Francis Chantrey.

== Marriages ==
Barrington married firstly, on 2 February 1761, the Lady Diana Beauclerk (c. 1735–28 March 1766), daughter of Charles Beauclerk, 2nd Duke of St Albans. His wife died in childbirth, the child stillborn. He married secondly, on 20 June 1770, Jane Guise (d. 8 August 1807), daughter of Sir John Guise, but had no children.

== Styles and titles ==
- 1734–1756: The Honourable Shute Barrington
- 1756–1761: The Reverend and Honourable Shute Barrington
- 1761–1769: The Reverend and Honourable Canon Shute Barrington
- 1769–1826: The Right Reverend and Honourable Shute Barrington

Church of England titles
Preceded by Jonathan Shipley	Bishop of Llandaff; 1769–1782	Succeeded by Richard Watson
Preceded by John Hume	Bishop of Salisbury; 1782–1791	Succeeded by John Douglas
Preceded by Thomas Thurlow	Bishop of Durham; 1791–1826	Succeeded by William Van Mildert
