= Barrington (name) =

Barrington is both a given name and a surname of English origin.

== Given name ==
- Barrington Bartley (born 1980), American cricketer
- Barrington J. Bayley (1937–2008), English science fiction writer
- Barrington Belgrave (born 1980), English footballer
- Barrington Boardman (1933–2004), American author
- Barrington Bourchier (c.1627–1695), English politician
- Barrington Browne (born 1967), West Indian former cricketer
- Sir Barrington Windsor Cunliffe (born 1939), British archaeologist
- Barrington Dacres (died 1806), Royal Navy captain
- Barrington Francis (born 1965), Jamaican/Canadian boxer
- Barrington "Bo" Henderson (born 1956), African-American R&B singer
- Barrington Hendricks (born 1989), African-American rapper, better known by his stage name JPEGMAFIA
- Barrington Hole (1942–2019), Welsh footballer
- Barrington Irving (born 1983), Jamaican pilot who flew solo round the world
- Barrington King, son of Roswell King and co-founder of Roswell, Georgia, United States
- Barrington Levy (born 1964), Jamaican reggae musician
- Barrington Moore Sr. (1883–unknown), American forester and forestry researcher
- Barrington Moore Jr. (1913–2005), American sociologist
- Barrington D. Parker Sr. (1915–1993), United States federal judge
- Barrington Daniels Parker Jr. (born 1944), United States federal judge
- Barrington Pheloung (1954–2019), Australian composer
- Sir Barrington Reynolds (1786–1861), Royal Navy admiral
- Barrington Rowland (born 1980), Indian cricketer
- Barrington Watson (1931–2016), Jamaican painter
- Barrington Yearwood (born 1986), Barbadian cricketer

== Surname ==
- Alphonse J. Barrington (c. 1832 – 1893), New Zealand gold prospector and explorer
- Amy Barrington (c. 1858 –1942), Irish teacher, scientist and family historian
- Archibald Charles Barrington (1906–1986), New Zealand clerk, secretary and pacifist
- Ben Barrington, New Zealand actor
- Charles Barrington (disambiguation)
- Daines Barrington, (1727–1800), English lawyer, antiquary and naturalist
- Diana Barrington (born 1939), British actress
- Donal Barrington (died 2018), Irish judge
- Emilie Barrington (1841–1933), British biographer and novelist
- Sir Eric Barrington (1847–1918), British civil servant
- Ernest Barrington (1909–1985), British zoologist and endocrinologist
- Sir Francis Barrington (c. 1570 – 1628), English lawyer and politician
- George Barrington (disambiguation)
- Henry Barrington (1808–1882), South African lawyer, farmer and politician
- Jimmy Barrington (1901–unknown), English footballer
- Joey Barrington (born 1980), English professional squash player
- John Barrington (disambiguation)
- Jonah Barrington (disambiguation)
- Ken Barrington (1930–1981), English Test cricketer
- Manliffe Barrington (1912–1999), Irish motorcycle racer
- Martin Barrington, American businessman
- Mary Rose Barrington (1926–2020), British parapsychologist and barrister
- Merrill Edwin Barrington (1920–1965), Canadian politician
- Michael Barrington (1924–1988), British actor
- Patrick Barrington, 11th Viscount Barrington (1908–1990), Irish writer of humorous verse
- Phyllis Barrington (1907–1996), American actress
- Reto Barrington (born 1952), Canadian former alpine skier
- Richard Barrington (disambiguation)
- Rutland Barrington (1853–1922), English musical theatre performer
- Sally Barrington, British oncologist and medical researcher
- Samuel Barrington (1729–1800), British admiral in the Seven Years' War
- Sam Barrington (born 1990), American football linebacker
- Shute Barrington (1734–1826), English churchman, Bishop of Llandaff, Salisbury and Durham
- Sir Thomas Barrington, 2nd Baronet (died 1644), English politician
- Tom Barrington (1944–2002), former American football running back
- Walter Barrington, 9th Viscount Barrington (1848–1933)
- William Barrington (disambiguation)
