= Barrington =

Barrington may refer to:

== People ==
- Barrington (name)
- Barrington baronets, holders of a title in the baronetage of England
- Viscount Barrington, a title in the peerage of Ireland

== Places ==
=== Australia ===
- Barrington, New South Wales
- Barrington, Tasmania
- Barrington River (New South Wales)
- Barrington Tops National Park, New South Wales
- Lower Barrington, Tasmania

=== Canada ===
- Municipality of the District of Barrington, Nova Scotia
- Barrington, Nova Scotia (community)
- Barrington Head, Nova Scotia
- Barrington Passage, Nova Scotia
- Barrington, Quebec
- Barrington Street, Halifax
- CFS Barrington, Nova Scotia, a former Canadian Forces Station

=== New Zealand ===
- Barrington, New Zealand, a suburb in Christchurch

=== United Kingdom ===
- Barrington, Cambridgeshire
- Barrington, Gloucestershire, a civil parish
  - Great Barrington, Gloucestershire, a village
  - Little Barrington, Gloucestershire, a village
- Barrington, Somerset

=== United States ===
- Barrington, Illinois
- Great Barrington, Massachusetts
- Barrington, New Hampshire
- Barrington, New Jersey
- Barrington, New York
- Barrington, Rhode Island

=== Other countries ===
- Barrington Island, English name of Santa Fe Island in the Galápagos Islands

== Buildings ==
- Barrington Court in Barrington, Somerset, England
- Barrington Hall (Berkeley, California), Berkeley, California, USA
- Barrington Hall, Essex, England, in the village of Hatfield Broad Oak

== Other ==
- Barrington Atlas of the Greek and Roman World, an atlas of ancient geography
- Barrington Broadcasting, a company operating US TV stations
- Barrington College was a four-year Christian liberal arts college located in Barrington, Rhode Island. It is no longer in operation; its facilities were subsequently sold to Zion Bible College
- Barrington Griffiths Watch Company, a watch maker in Calgary
- Barrington station, a train station in Barrington, Illinois
- Barrington's theorem, a result in computational complexity theory
- Barrington University, former name of the University of Atlanta, a distance-learning school
- The Great Barrington Declaration - a viewpoint about COVID-19 vaccination

== See also ==
- Barrington High School (disambiguation)
