= Thomas Wright (philanthropist) =

Prison philanthropist

Thomas Wright (1789–1875) was a prison philanthropist.

== Biography ==
He received his education at a Wesleyan Sunday school, and when fifteen years old was apprenticed to an ironfounder, ultimately becoming foreman of the foundry at £3.10s. a week. In 1817, after a few years of indifference to religion, he joined the congregationalists, and was deacon of the chapel in Grosvenor Street, Piccadilly, Manchester, from 1825 to the end of his life. Among the labourers in the same workshop with him was a discharged convict, whom he saved from dismissal by depositing £20 for the man's good behaviour. This circumstance directed his attention to the reclamation of discharged prisoners, and about 1838 he obtained permission to visit the Salford prison. As he was at work at the foundry from five in the morning until six in the evening, he could spend only his evenings and his Sunday afternoons at the prison, where he became the trusted friend of the inmates, for large numbers of whom on their release he obtained honest employment, his personal guarantee being given in many cases. The value of his labours was made public by the reports of the prison inspectors and chaplains, and he was offered the post of government travelling inspector of prisons at a salary of 800l. This he declined, on the ground that if he were an official his influence would be lessened; but in 1852 he accepted a public testimonial of £3,248., including £100 from the Royal Bounty Fund. With this sum an annuity equal to the amount of his wages was purchased, and he was enabled to give up his situation at the foundry and devote all his time to the ministration of criminals. For some years he attended nearly every unfortunate wretch that was executed in England.

George Frederic Watts presented his picture of the 'Good Samaritan' to the Corporation of Manchester in May 1852, 'as a testimony of his high esteem for the exemplary and praiseworthy character' of Wright. Another picture, 'The Condemned Cell,' containing Wright's portrait, was painted by Charles Mercier, and presented by subscribers to the corporation of London in July 1869. Another portrait by Mercier was given to the Salford Museum. A full-length portrait by J. D. Watson, painted in 1853, was presented to Wright, and left by him to the visiting justices of Salford prison. Since the demolition of that building it has been placed in the committee-room of Strangeways prison, Manchester.

Wright gave evidence before select committees of the House of Commons in 1852 on criminal and destitute juveniles, and in 1854 on public-houses. He was a promoter of the reformatory at Blackley, and worked on behalf of the Boys' Refuge, the Shoeblack Brigade, and the ragged schools of Manchester and Salford. He was strongly in favour of compulsory education.

== Personal ==
Wright was born at Haddington near Edinburgh, in 1789, his father being a Scotsman and his mother a Manchester woman. Wright died at Manchester on 14 April 1875, and was buried in the churchyard of Birch-in-Rusholme. He was twice married, and had nineteen children.
