= Emilie Barrington =

British biographer and novelist

- Born: Emilie Isabel Wilson; October 18, 1841; Mayfair, London
- Died: March 9, 1933 (aged 91); Langport, Somerset
- Occupations: Biographer, author, artist
- Known for: Playing a leading role in establishing Leighton House as a museum
- Spouse: Russell Barrington

Emilie Isabel Barrington (18 October 1841 – 9 March 1933), was a British biographer, artist, and novelist. She became associated with the Holland Park Circle, was instrumental in establishing Leighton House Museum, and co-founded the Kyrle Society.

== Early life ==
Emilie Isabel Wilson was born on 18 October 1841 in Mayfair, London, the youngest of six daughters born to James and Elizabeth Preston Wilson. James Wilson was a merchant, an active participant in the Anti-Corn Law League, and the founder of The Economist. Emilie spent her early years on the Continent and was educated, like her sisters, by governesses. She attended school in Cologne 1855–56, and in 1858 went to a finishing school in Paris.

In 1859, James Wilson became the financial member of the supreme council of India. He died the following year.

On 1 July 1868, Wilson married Russell Barrington, with whom she had two sons. Their second child, Ivo, died in 1871 aged four months. Around the time of her marriage, Emilie met the artist George Frederic Watts. They became close friends, and she later wrote his biography.

== Work ==
In the 1860s, Wilson met the activist Emily Faithfull, with whom she shared an interest in increasing the employment opportunities available to women.

Barrington formed a friendship with one of Frederic Leighton's sisters, and went on to write the first major biography of the artist: Life, Letters, and Works of Frederic Leighton (1906). After Leighton's death in 1896, Barrington was instrumental in establishing Leighton House as a museum. She acted as President of the Leighton House Society.

In 1881, Barrington helped to found the Kyrle Society, which aimed to "bring beauty home to the poor". She painted a portrait of one of its leading figures, Octavia Hill, and became an early council member of the National Trust, of which Hill was a founder.

During the 1890s, Barrington wrote two novels: Lena's Picture (1892) and Helen's Ordeal (1894). A third, A St. Luke of the 19th Century was published on her 82nd birthday in 1923. She contributed to The Spectator, The Nineteenth Century, and The Fortnightly Review.

== Bibliography ==
In addition to writing articles for the serials Fortnightly Review and The Spectator, Barrington wrote several stand-alone works:

- Reminiscences of G. F. Watts (1905)
- Lena's Picture (1892) (novel)
- Helen's Ordeal (1894) (novel)
- The Reality of the Spiritual Life (1889) (pamphlet)
- Through Greece and Dalmatia (1912) (travel memoir)
- Complete works of Walter Bagehot (editor) (1914)
- The Servant of All (1927)
- The Love Letters of Walter Bagehot and Eliza Wilson (editor) (1933)
- Memories of a long life (autobiography - lost)
