= Sally Barrington =

British oncologist medical researcher

Sally Barrington is a British oncologist and medical researcher. She is a professor of positron emission tomography (PET) Imaging and National Institute for Health Research (NIHR) research professor at King's College London (KCL), England, United Kingdom. She joined KCL in 1993.

== Education ==
Barrington obtained her MB BS from the United Medical Dental Schools of Guy's and St Thomas', University of London.

Barrington obtained her nuclear medicine training at the Guy's and St Thomas’ Hospital London, where she was later appointed as a consultant in 1998.

== Career ==
Her research is focused on the study of lymphoma cancer and radiotherapy planning using PET imaging. She has been involved in numerous multicentre clinical trials. She has also work experience in other clinical areas, including, but not limited to, oncology, neurology, cardiology and infection/inflammation. She co-leads the UK PET Research Network.

In 2019, Barrington was awarded the British Nuclear Medicine Society (BNMS) Roll of Honour. Barrington sits on the Editorial Board of Journal of Clinical Oncology; she is the chair of the National Institute for Health Research Academy Involvement Group and the Radiation Safety Committee of Guy's and St Thomas' NHS Foundation Trust. She is a member of various professional organisations, including the Scientific Committee for international workshops on PET in lymphoma, European Lymphoma Institute, Administration of Radioactive Substances Advisory Committee (ARSAC), CRUK Expert Review Panel, Oncology Committee of the European Association of Nuclear Medicine, and National Cancer Research Institute (NCRI) Clinical Studies Group in Lymphoma.

== Selected publications ==
=== Scientific journal papers ===
- 1980 citations: Recommendations for initial evaluation, staging, and response assessment of Hodgkin and non-Hodgkin lymphoma: the Lugano classification.
- 1133 citations: FDG PET/CT: EANM procedure guidelines for tumour imaging: version 2.0.
- 926 citations: Role of imaging in the staging and response assessment of lymphoma: consensus of the International Conference on Malignant Lymphomas Imaging Working Group.

=== Books edited ===
- 1999: Atlas of Clinical Positron Emission Tomography: By R. Wahl, S. Barrington, M. Maisey. CRC Press.
- 2005: Atlas of Clinical Positron Emission Tomography 2nd Edition: By R. Wahl, S. Barrington, M. Maisey. Hodder Education.

=== Book chapters ===
- Chapter 20 in PET/MRI in Oncology: Current Clinical Applications edited by Andrei Iagaru, Thomas Hope, Patrick Veit-Haibach.
- Chapter 8 in Radiotherapy for Hodgkin Lymphoma edited by Lena Specht, Joachim Yahalom.
