= John Barrington =

John Barrington may refer to:

- John Barrington (14th century MP), MP for Essex
- John Barrington (MP for Dunwich) (1624–?), English politician
- Sir John Barrington, 3rd Baronet (1605–1683), English MP for Newtown, 1645–1648 and 1660–1679
- Sir John Barrington, 4th Baronet (1670–1691), of the Barrington baronets
- Sir John Barrington, 6th Baronet (c. 1673–1717), of the Barrington baronets
- Sir John Barrington, 7th Baronet (c. 1707–1776), British MP for Newtown, 1729–1734 and 1741–1775
- Sir John Barrington, 9th Baronet (1752–1818), British MP for Newtown, 1780–1796
- John Barrington, 1st Viscount Barrington (1678–1734), English lawyer and theologian
- John Barrington (British Army officer) (died 1764)
- John Barrington (Irish politician) (1824–1887), member of a Quaker merchant family, and Lord Mayor of Dublin
- John S. Barrington (1920–1992), British physique photographer

== See also ==
- Barrington (disambiguation)
