= Administration of Radioactive Substances Advisory Committee =

United Kingdom expert advisory committee

- Type: Expert Committee
- Website: www.gov.uk/government/organisations/administration-of-radioactive-substances-advisory-committee

The Administration of Radioactive Substances Advisory Committee (ARSAC) is an expert committee sponsored by the Department of Health.

ARSAC advises the licensing authority on the granting, amendment and renewal of licences to employers and practitioners for the administration of radioactive substances. This is required under regulation 5 of the Ionising Radiation (Medical Exposure) Regulations 2017 in Great Britain and regulation 5 of the Ionising Radiation (Medical Exposure) Regulations 2018 in Northern Ireland. ARSAC provides assessment of research studies which include administrations of radioactive substances as specified in regulation 11(1)(d) of IR(ME)R.

ARSAC also provides general guidance and advice to the health departments and healthcare professionals on the use of radioactive substances in clinical medicine and research.

The majority of ARSAC’s members are medical doctors who are appointed to the committee as independent experts in their field (for example nuclear medicine). The committee comments on applications in confidence to the ARSAC Support Unit, UK Health Security Agency. No individual committee member approves any single application.

== See also ==
- Centre for Radiation, Chemical and Environmental Hazards in Oxfordshire
