= Jonah Barrington =

Jonah Barrington is the name of:

- Jonah Barrington (judge) (1760–1834), Irish judge and memoirist
- Jonah Barrington (journalist) (1904–1986), pen name of Cyril Carr Dalmain, who coined the term Lord Haw Haw
- Jonah Barrington (squash player) (born 1941), Irish/English squash player
