= Richard Barrington =

Richard Barrington may refer to:

- Richard Barrington (naturalist) (1849–1915), Irish naturalist
- Richard Barrington (rugby union) (born 1990), English rugby union player
- Richard Barrington, 4th Viscount Barrington (died 1813), British aristocrat
