= Barrington High School =

Barrington High School may refer to:

- Barrington High School (Illinois), Lake County, Illinois
- Barrington High School (Rhode Island), Barrington, Rhode Island
