= George Frederic Watts =

English painter (1817–1904)

George Frederic Watts OM RA
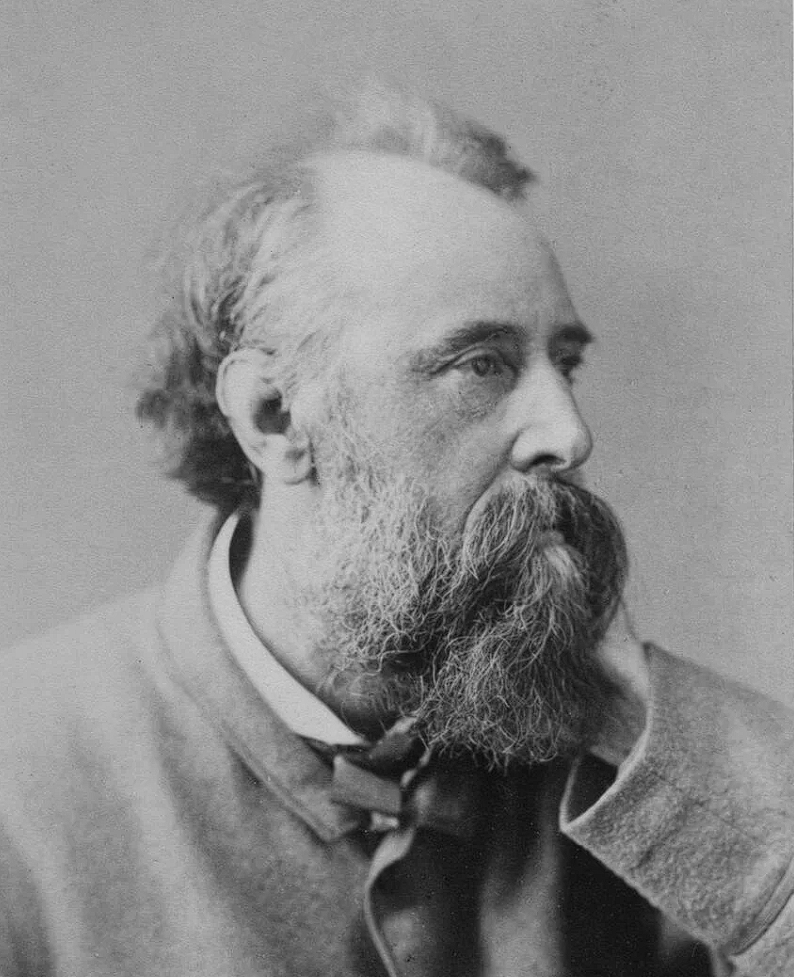
- Watts c. 1870
- Born: 23 February 1817; Marylebone, Middlesex, England
- Died: 1 July 1904 (aged 87); London, England
- Education: William Behnes; Royal Academy Schools
- Known for: Painting, sculpture
- Notable work: Hope; Love and Life; Physical Energy
- Movement: Symbolist
- Spouses: Ellen Terry (m. 1864; div. 1877); Mary Fraser Tytler (m. 1886)
- Awards: Order of Merit
- Patrons: Alexander Constantine Ionides

Signature
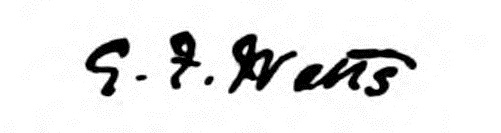

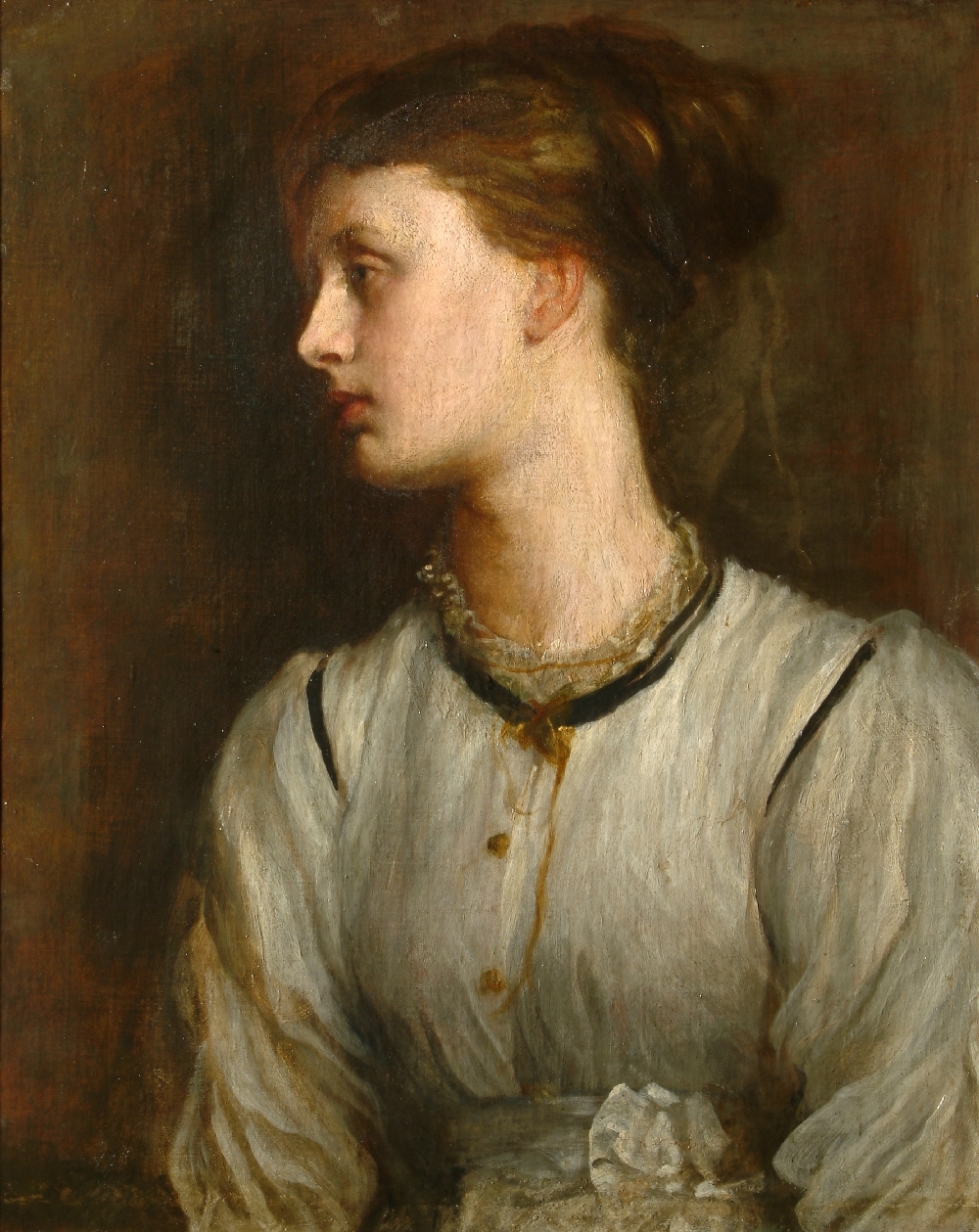
Miss May Prinsep

George Frederic Watts (23 February 1817 – 1 July 1904) was a British painter and sculptor associated with the Symbolist movement. Watts became famous in his lifetime for his allegorical works, such as Hope and Love and Life. These paintings were intended to form part of an epic symbolic cycle called the "House of Life", in which the emotions and aspirations of life would all be represented in a universal symbolic language.

== Early life and education ==
Watts was born in Marylebone in central London on the birthday of George Frederic Handel (after whom he was named), to the second wife of a poor piano-maker. Delicate in health and with his mother dying while he was still young, he was home-schooled by his father in a conservative interpretation of Christianity as well as via the classics such as the Iliad. The former put him off conventional religion for life, while the latter was a continual influence on his art. He showed artistic promise very early, learning sculpture from the age of 10 with William Behnes, starting to study devotedly the Elgin Marbles (later writing "It was from them alone that I learned") and then enrolling as a student at the Royal Academy Schools at the age of 18.

== Career ==
=== First exhibitions ===
He first exhibited at the Royal Academy Exhibition of 1837, with a picture of "The Wounded Heron" and two portraits, but his attendance at the Academy was short-lived, and his further art education was confined to personal experiment and endeavour, guided by a constant appeal to the standard of ancient Greek sculpture. He also began his portraiture career, receiving patronage from his close contemporary Alexander Constantine Ionides, who later came to be a close friend.

=== Westminster mural prize ===
He came to the public eye with a drawing entitled Caractacus, which was entered for a competition to design murals for the new Houses of Parliament at Westminster in 1843. Watts won a first prize in the competition, which was intended to promote narrative paintings on patriotic subjects, appropriate to the nation's legislature, securing a prize of £300. In the end Watts made little contribution to the Westminster decorations, but from it he conceived his vision of a building covered with murals representing the spiritual and social evolution of humanity.

=== Italian travels ===
The prize from the Westminster competition did, however, fund a long visit to Italy from 1843 onwards, where Watts stayed and became friends with the British ambassador Henry Fox, 4th Baron Holland and his wife Augusta at their homes in Casa Feroni and the Villa Careggi in Tuscany. For them he painted a portrait of Lady Holland, exhibited in 1848, and in the villa a fresco, after making some experimental studies in that medium. Also while in Italy Watts began producing landscapes and was inspired by Michelangelo's Sistine Chapel and Giotto's Scrovegni Chapel. In 1847, while still in Italy, Watts entered a new competition for the Houses of Parliament with his image of Alfred the Great, Alfred Inciting the Saxons to Prevent the Landing of the Danes by Encountering them at Sea, on a patriotic subject but using Phidean inspiration.

=== Return to Britain ===
Leaving Florence in April 1847 for what was intended to be a brief return to London, he ended up staying. After obtaining a first-class prize of £500, his winning painting at the exhibition in Westminster Hall was purchased by the government, and was hung in one of the committee rooms of the House of Commons. It led, moreover, to a commission for the fresco of "St George overcomes the Dragon," which, begun in 1848 and finished in 1853, formed part of the decorations of the Hall of the Poets in the Houses of Parliament.

Back in Britain he was unable to obtain a building in which to carry out his plan of a grand fresco based on his Italian experiences, though he did produce a 45 ft by 40 ft fresco on the upper part of the east wall of the Great Hall of Lincoln's Inn entitled Justice, A Hemicycle of Lawgivers (completed 1859), inspired by Raphael's The School of Athens. In consequence most of his major works are conventional oil paintings, some of which were intended as studies for the House of Life.

=== Prinsep circle ===
In his studio he met Henry Thoby Prinsep (for 16 years a member of the Council of India) and his wife Sara (née Pattle). Watts thus joined the Prinsep circle of bohemians, including Sara's seven sisters (including Virginia, with whom Watts fell in love but who married Charles, Viscount Eastnor in 1850), and Julia Margaret Cameron. Previously staying at 48 Cambridge Street, and then in Mayfair, in 1850 he helped the Prinseps into a 21-year lease on Little Holland House, and stayed there with them and their salon for the next 21 years. (The building was the dower house on the Hollands' London estate in Kensington, near the house of Lord Leighton.)

=== Productive painting period ===
While the Lincoln's Inn undertaking was still in progress, Watts was working steadily at pictures and portraits. In 1849 the first two of the allegorical compositions which form the most characteristic of the artist's productions were exhibited—"Life's Illusions," an elaborate presentment of the vanity of human desires, and "The people that sat in darkness," turning eagerly towards the growing dawn. In 1850 he first gave public expression to his intense longing to improve the condition of humanity in the picture of "The Good Samaritan" bending over the wounded traveller; this, as recorded in the catalogue of the Royal Academy, was "painted as an expression of the artist's admiration and respect for the noble philanthropy of Thomas Wright, of Manchester," and to that city he presented the work. From the late 1840s onward he painted many portraits in France and England, some of which are described below. Notable pictures of the same period are "Sir Galahad" (1862), "Ariadne in Naxos" (1863), "Time and Oblivion" (1864), originally designed for sculpture to be carried out "in divers materials after the manner of Pheidias," and "Thetis" (1866).

=== Teaching, further travels ===
One of only two pupils Watts ever accepted was Henry's son Valentine Cameron Prinsep; the other was John Roddam Spencer Stanhope — both remained friends, but neither became a major artist. While living as tenant at Little Holland House, Watts's epic paintings were exhibited in Whitechapel by his friend the social reformer Canon Samuel Barnett, and he finally received a commission for the Houses of Parliament, completing his The Triumph of the Red Cross Knight (from The Faerie Queene) in 1852–53. He also took a short trip back to Italy in 1853 (including Venice, where Titian became yet more of an inspiration) and with Charles Thomas Newton to excavate Halicarnassus in 1856–57, via Constantinople and the Greek islands. In 1856 Watts paid a visit to Lord Holland, for whom he would later design a statue, in Paris where he was then ambassador. Through him he made the acquaintance and painted the portraits of Adolphe Thiers, Jérôme Bonaparte and other famous Frenchmen. Apart from some visits to Italy, Greece and Egypt, the greater part of his subsequent life was passed in the seclusion of his home studios.

=== Brief marriage ===
In the 1860s, Watts's work shows the influence of Rossetti, often emphasising sensuous pleasure and rich colour. Among these paintings is a portrait of his young wife, the actress Ellen Terry, who was 30 years his junior – having been introduced by mutual friend Tom Taylor, they married on 20 February 1864, just seven days short of her 17th birthday. They separated within a year of the wedding; Watts did not immediately divorce her, but made her allowance (paid to her father) conditional on her never returning to the stage.

=== Later influences ===
Watts's association with Rossetti and the Aesthetic movement altered during the 1870s, as his work increasingly combined Classical traditions with a deliberately agitated and troubled surface, to suggest the dynamic energies of life and evolution, as well as the tentative and transitory qualities of life. These works formed part of a revised version of the House of Life, influenced by the ideas of Max Müller, the founder of comparative religion. Watts hoped to trace the evolving "mythologies of the races [of the world]" in a grand synthesis of spiritual ideas with modern science, especially Darwinian evolution.

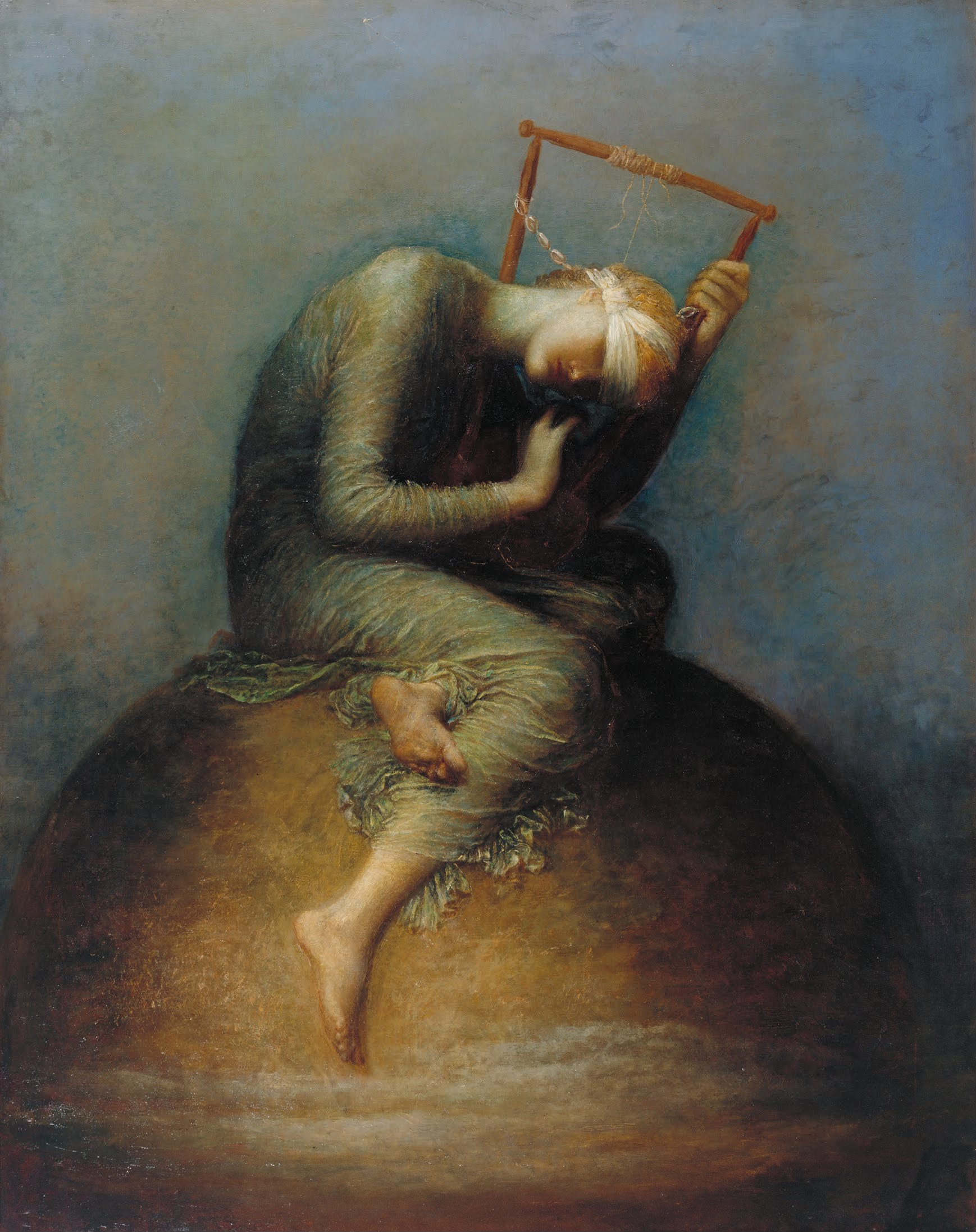
Hope, painted in 1886 and given to the nation in 1897

=== Later life ===
With the lease on Little Holland House nearing its end and the building soon to be demolished, in the early 1870s he commissioned a new London home nearby from F. P. Cockerell: New Little Holland House (backing onto the estate of Lord Leighton), and acquired a house at Freshwater, Isle of Wight – his friends Julia Margaret Cameron and Lord Tennyson already had homes on the island. To maintain his friendship with the Prinsep family as their children began leaving home, he built The Briary for them near Freshwater, and adopted their relative Blanche Clogstoun. In 1877, his decree nisi from Ellen Terry finally came through, and the Grosvenor Gallery was opened by his friend Coutts Lindsay. This was to prove his ideal venue for the next ten years.

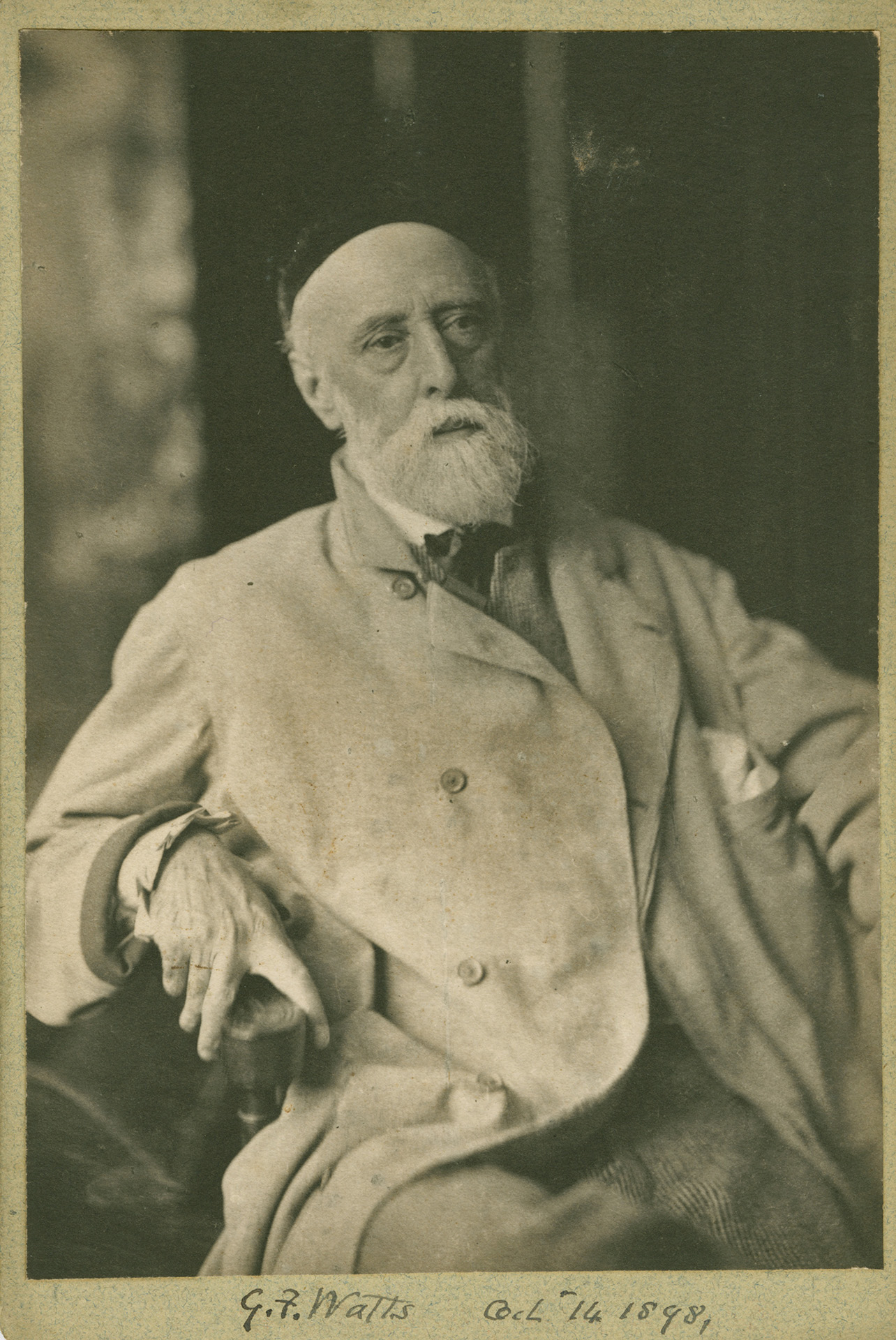
George Frederic Watts, 1898, platinum print by Frederick Hollyer, Department of Image Collections, National Gallery of Art Library, Washington, DC

In 1886, at the age of 69, Watts remarried, to Mary Fraser Tytler, a Scottish designer and potter, then aged 36. In 1891 he bought land near Compton, south of Guildford, in Surrey. The couple named the house "Limnerslease" (combining the words "limner" or artist with "leasen" or glean) and built the Watts Gallery nearby, a museum dedicated to his work – the first (and now the only) purpose-built gallery in Britain devoted to a single artist – which opened in April 1904, shortly before his death, and received a major expansion between 2006 and 2011.

=== Watts Mortuary Chapel ===
Watts's wife Mary had designed the nearby earlier Watts Mortuary Chapel, which Watts paid for; he also painted a version of The All-Pervading for the altar only three months before he died. Both Limnerslease and the chapel are now maintained, and the house owned, by the Watts Gallery. In 2016 Watts's studio in the house re-opened, restored as far as possible using photographs from Watts's lifetime, as part of the Watts Gallery, and the main residential section can be visited on a guided tour.

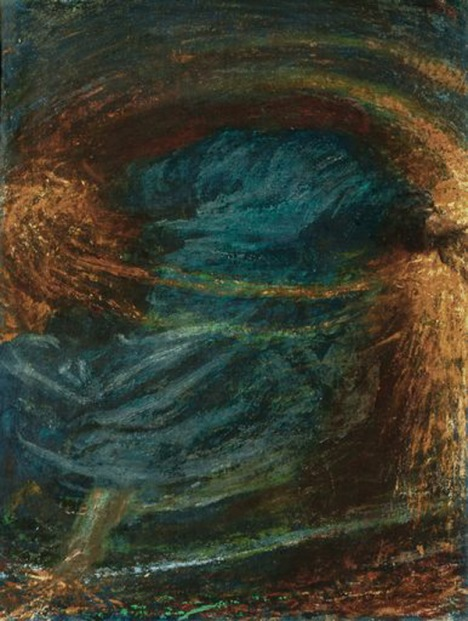
The Sower of the Systems

=== Collections ===
Many of his paintings are owned by Tate Britain – he donated 18 of his symbolic paintings to Tate in 1897, and three more in 1900. Some of these have been loaned to the Watts Gallery in recent years, and are on display there.

=== Awards and honours ===
Refusing the baronetcy twice offered him by Queen Victoria, he was finally elected as an Academician to the Royal Academy in 1867 and accepted to be one of the original members of the new Order of Merit (OM) in 1902 — in his own words, on behalf of all English artists. The order was announced in the 1902 Coronation Honours list published on 26 June 1902, and he received the insignia from King Edward VII at Buckingham Palace on 8 August 1902.

=== Late paintings ===
In his late paintings, Watts's creative aspirations mutate into mystical images such as The Sower of the Systems, in which Watts seems to anticipate abstract art. This painting depicts God as a barely visible shape in an energised pattern of stars and nebulae. Some of Watts's other late works also seem to anticipate the paintings of Picasso's Blue Period.

=== Portraiture ===
He was also admired as a portrait painter. His portraits were of the most important men and women of the day, intended to form a "House of Fame". In his portraits Watts sought to create a tension between disciplined stability and the power of action. He was also notable for emphasising the signs of strain and wear on his sitter's faces. Of his British subjects many are now in the collection of the National Portrait Gallery: 17 were donated in 1895, with more than 30 more added subsequently. Some who sat for him from the late 1840s were François Guizot (1848), Sir Henry Rawlinson, Sir Henry Taylor and Thomas Wright (1851), Lord John Russell (1852), Tennyson (1856, and again in 1859), John Lothrop Motley the historian (1859), the Duke of Argyll (1860), Lord Lawrence and Lord Lyndhurst (1862), James Parke, 1st Baron Wensleydale (1864), Gladstone (1858 and 1865), Sir William Bowman and Swinburne (1865), Anthony Panizzi (1866) and Dean Stanley in 1867. Other sitters included Charles Dilke, Thomas Carlyle, James Martineau, and William Morris.

=== Physical Energy ===
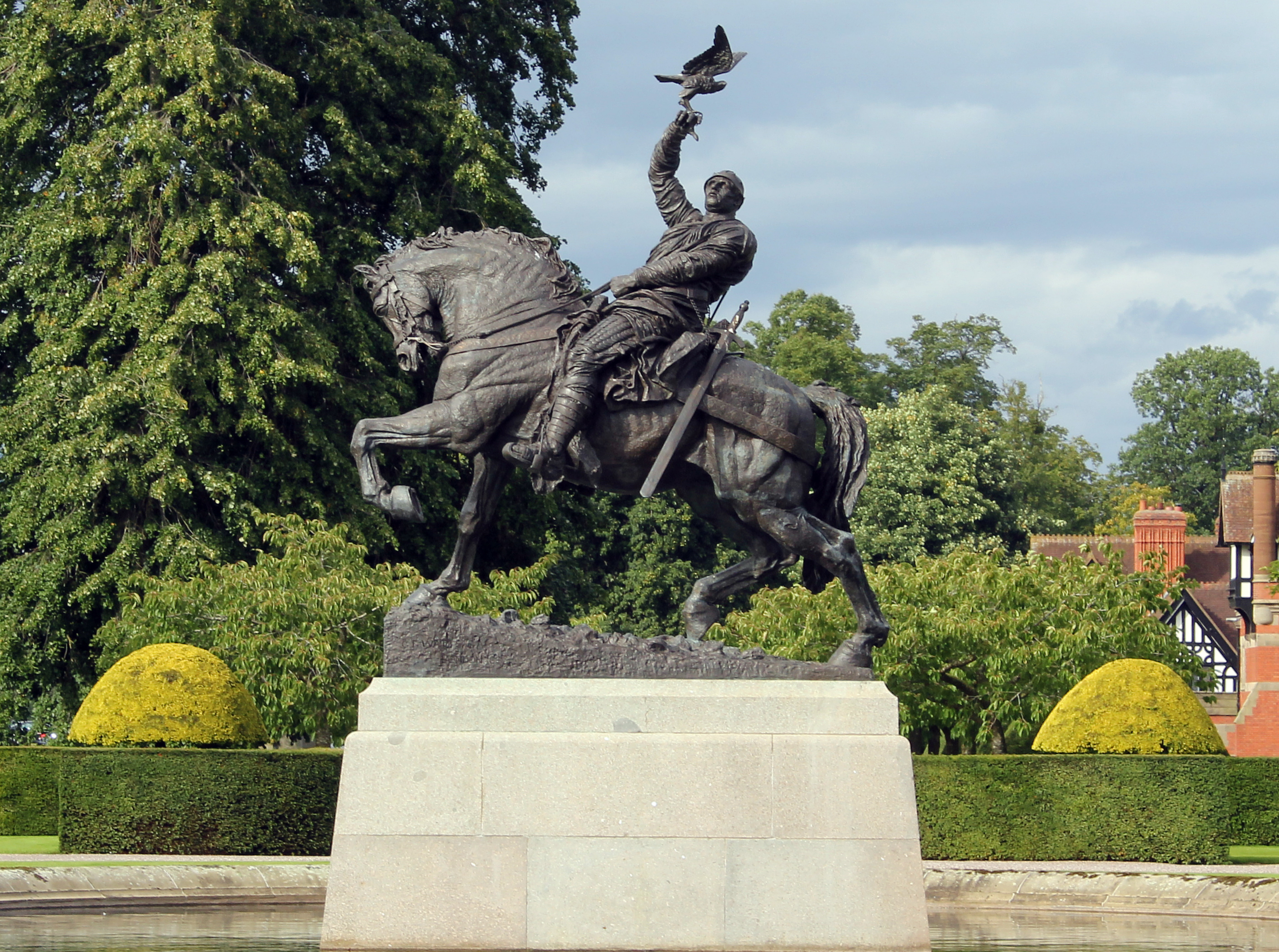
Equestrian statue of Hugh Lupus hawking on horseback, at Eaton Hall in Cheshire, sculpted by George Frederick Watts (1817–1904)

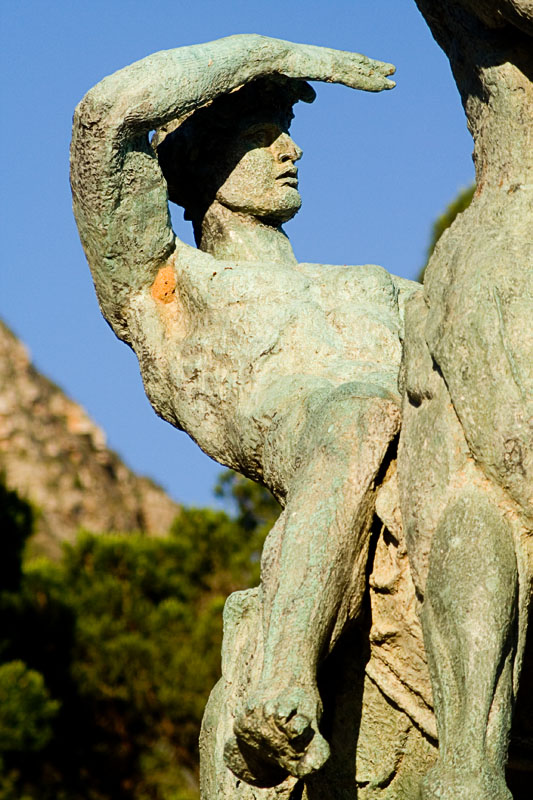
Detail of Physical Energy at Rhodes Memorial in Cape Town, South Africa

Although best known as a painter, Watts was also a sculptor. After completing a commission for the Duke of Westminster for an equestrian monument to commemorate his ancestor, Hugh Lupus, Watts set to work on a new plaster model of another horse and rider, without specific reference to any individual, in 1883. Seeking to reinvigorate the rhetoric of the equestrian monument for the modern age, he was still working on it at the time of his death in 1904. The plaster model was part of the artist's bequest to Watts Gallery, and, also in 1904, the first bronze cast of the work (made in 1902 at the Parlanti Foundry) became the artist's last submission to the Royal Academy's summer exhibition. It marked a new prominence for the courtyard of Burlington House as a site for dramatic contemporary sculpture (a role continued today by the Annenberg Courtyard). Physical Energy then travelled to Cape Town to form part of a memorial to the founder of Rhodesia (now Zimbabwe), Cecil Rhodes. In 1907, a posthumous cast was made and sited in Kensington Gardens, London, fulfilling the artist's intention to gift the work to the British Government, insisting that it should be "for the nation" and displayed "somewhere in London". A third cast, created in 1959, is situated in the grounds of the National Archives of Zimbabwe in Harare.

The culmination of Watts's ambition in the field of public sculpture, Physical Energy is an allegory of human vitality and humanity's ceaseless struggle for betterment; he said it was "a symbol of that restless physical impulse to seek the still unachieved in the domain of material things". It also embodied the artist's belief that access to great art would bring immense benefits to the country at large.

=== Memorial to Heroic Self-Sacrifice ===
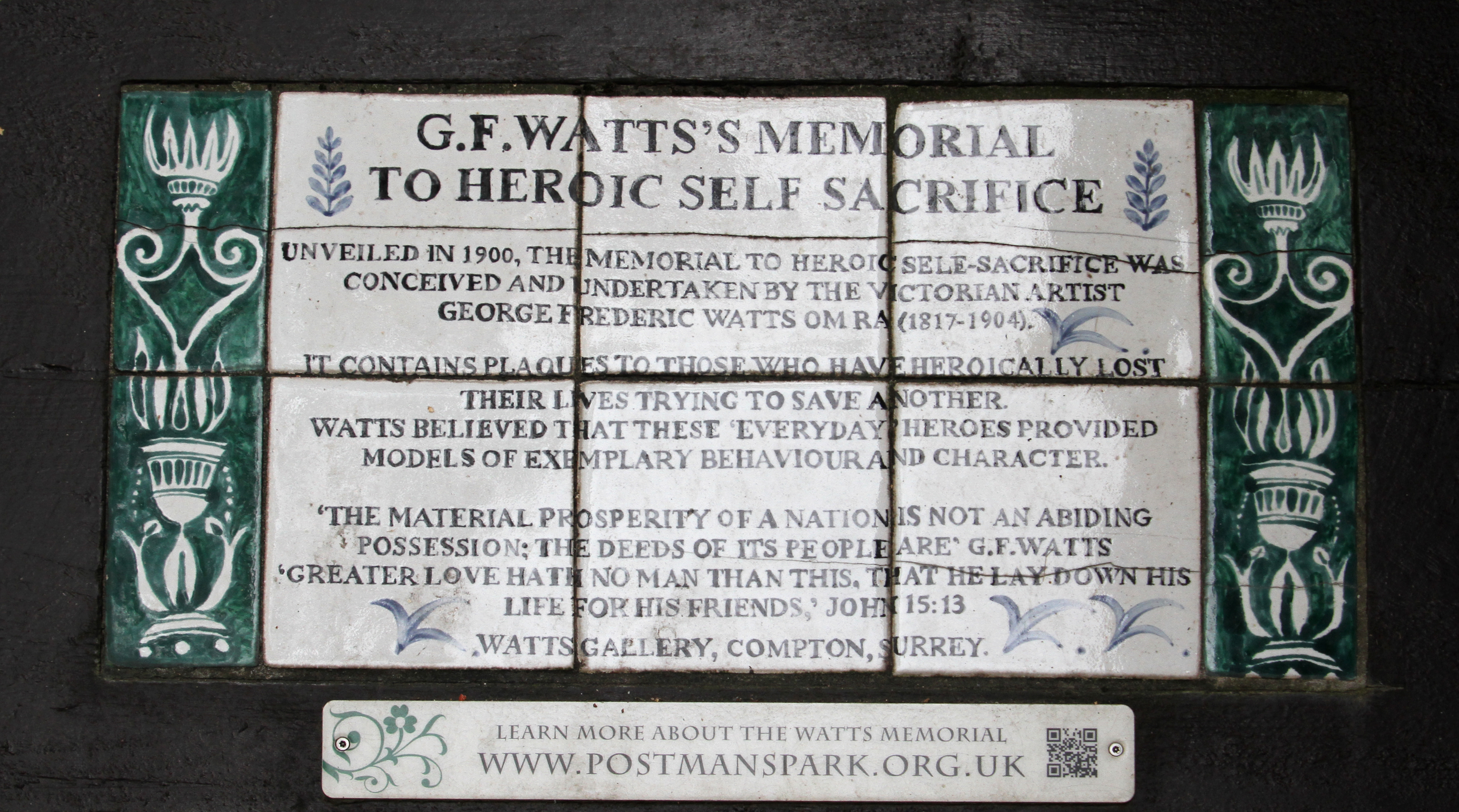
George Frederic Watts's Memorial to Heroic Self Sacrifice

An admirer of royalty – he had painted Prince de Joinville and Edward, Prince of Wales – Watts proposed, in 1887, to commemorate the Golden Jubilee of Queen Victoria by creating a Memorial to Heroic Self-Sacrifice to commemorate ordinary people who had died saving the lives of others, and who might otherwise have been forgotten. The scheme was not accepted at that time, but in 1898 Watts was approached by Henry Gamble, the vicar of St Botolph's Aldersgate church. He suggested the memorial could be created in Postman's Park in the City of London.

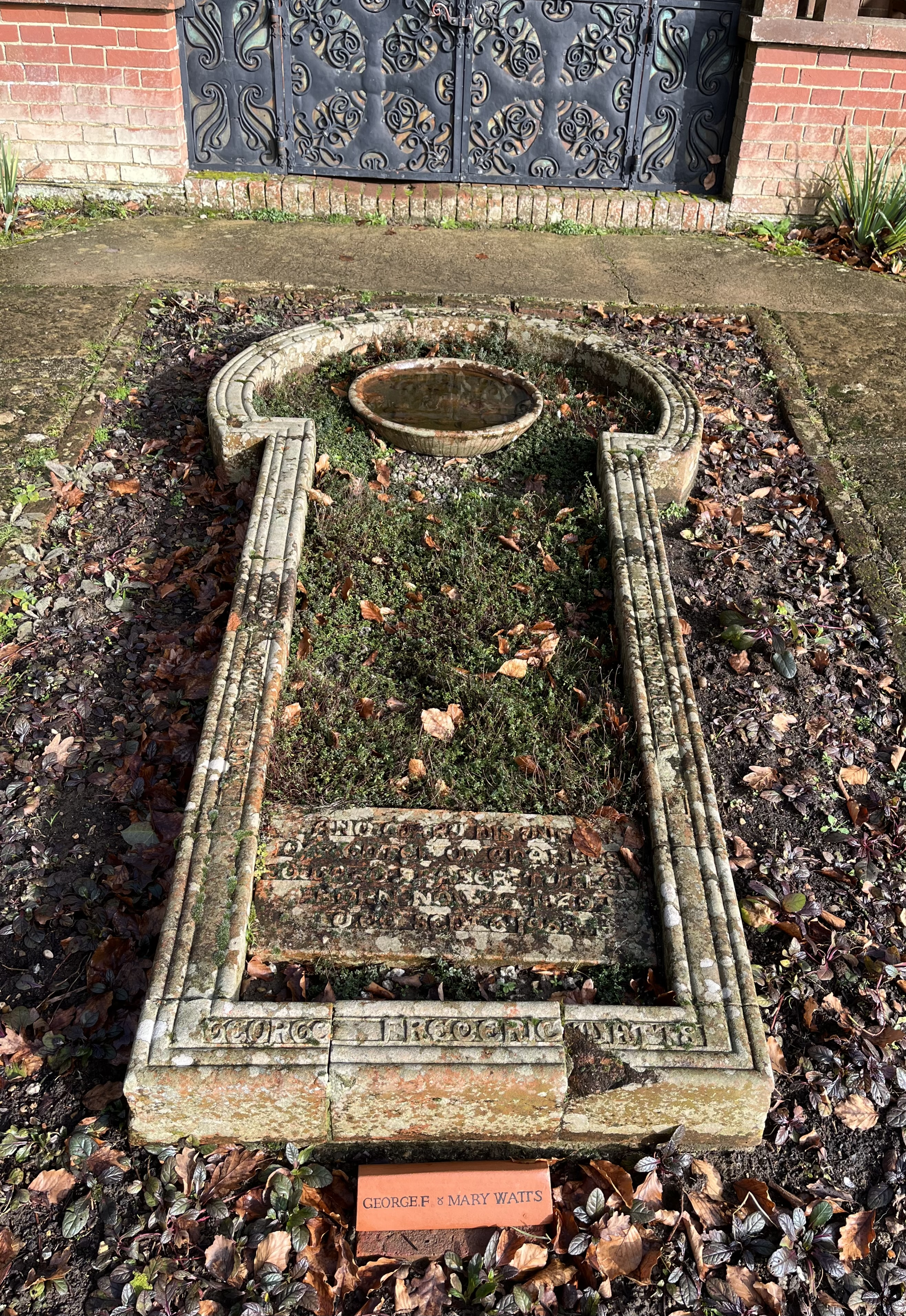
The grave of G F Watts at the Watts Cemetery Chapel in Surrey in 2026

The memorial was unveiled in an unfinished state in 1900, consisting of a 50-foot (15 m) wooden loggia designed by Ernest George, sheltering a wall with space for 120 ceramic memorial tiles to be designed and made by William De Morgan. At the time of opening, only four of the memorial tiles were in place. Watts died in 1904, and his widow Mary Watts took over the running of the project. He is buried in the cemetery at the Watts Cemetery Chapel at Compton in Surrey.

== Reception ==
Several reverent biographies of Watts were written shortly after his death; and one (by G. K. Chesterton) earlier in the year of his death. With the emergence of Modernism, however, his reputation declined. Virginia Woolf's comic play Freshwater portrays him in a satirical manner, an approach also adopted by Wilfred Blunt, former curator of the Watts Gallery, in his irreverent 1975 biography England's Michelangelo. In his 1988 book on Ruskin, the art critic Peter Fuller emphasised Watts's spiritual and stylistic importance, also noting that late post-symbolist works such as The Sower of the Systems "stretched beyond the brink of abstraction". On the centenary of his death Veronica Franklin Gould published G. F. Watts: The Last Great Victorian, a positive study of his life and work.

The composer Charles Villiers Stanford wrote his Sixth Symphony "In Memoriam G. F. Watts". It was composed in 1905 and first performed on 18 January 1906 in London under Stanford's direction. The four movements, although not having a detailed programme, are inspired by several works of art by Watts.

Literary references to Watts and his work include Elizabeth Taylor's 1953 novel Angel, where a picture by Watts is donated to a provincial museum by the protagonist, and mention of Watts's painting Progress in Bella Donna by Robert Hichens (1909, p. 34). Watts features (not altogether favourably) as a character in Lynne Truss's comic novel Tennyson's Gift (1996).

== Gallery ==
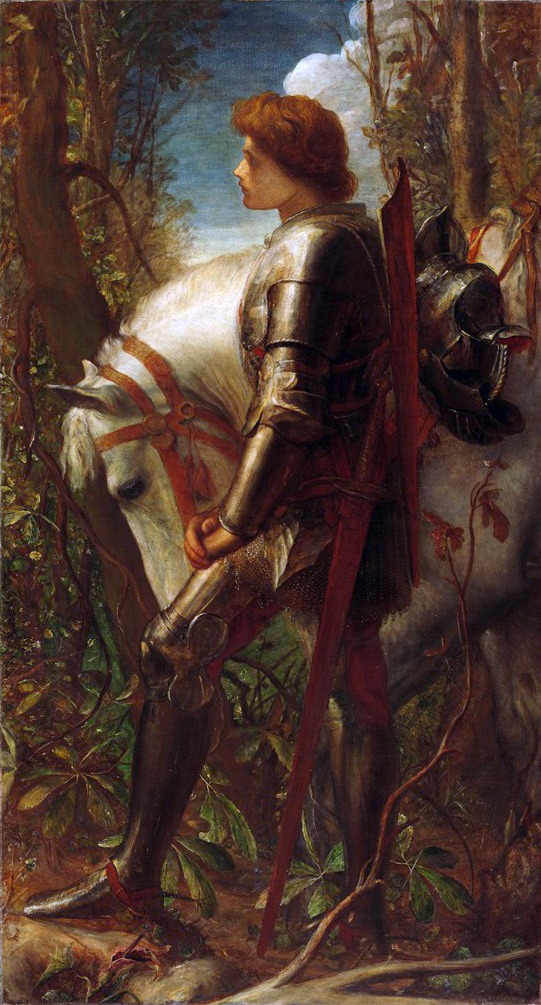
Sir Galahad

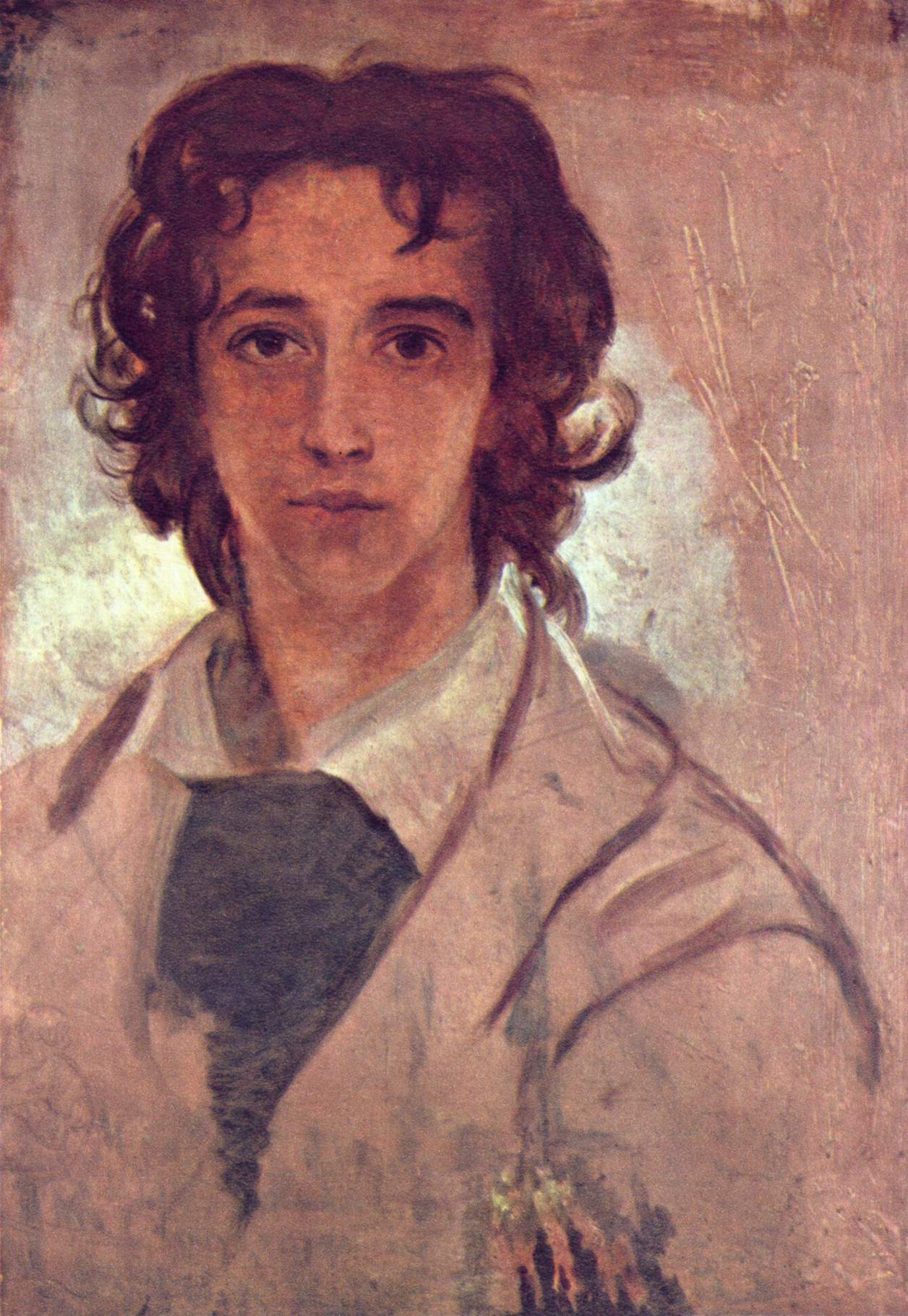
Self-portrait

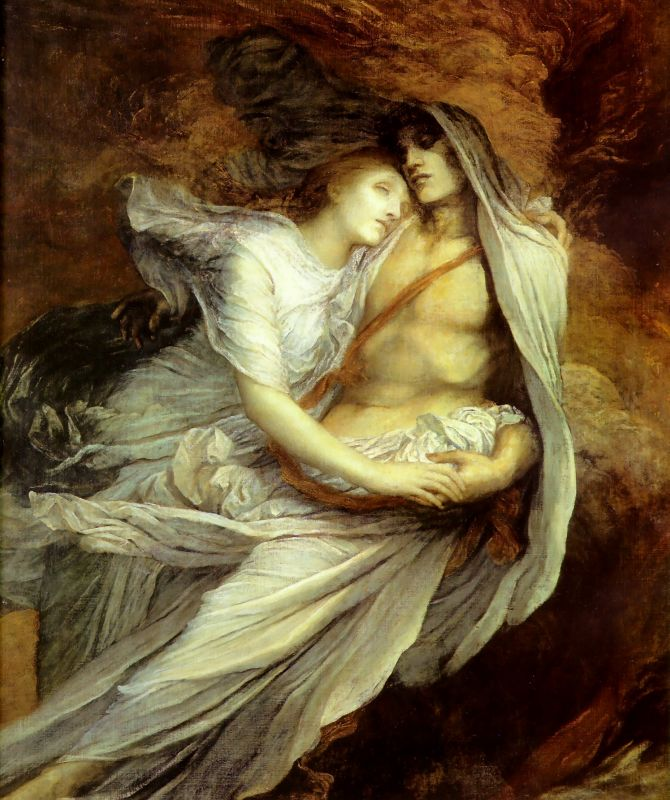
Paolo and Francesca

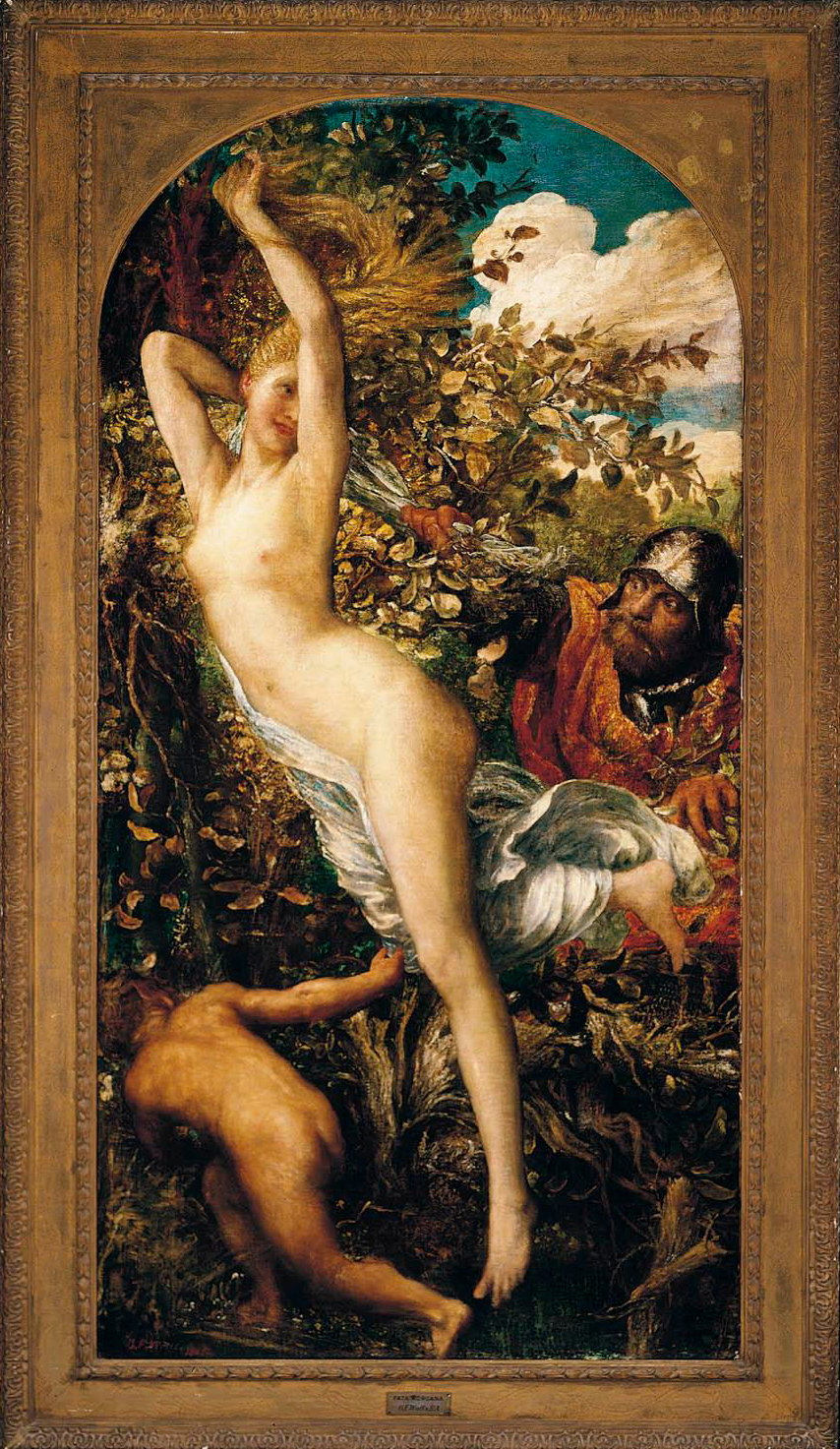
Fata Morgana, 1865

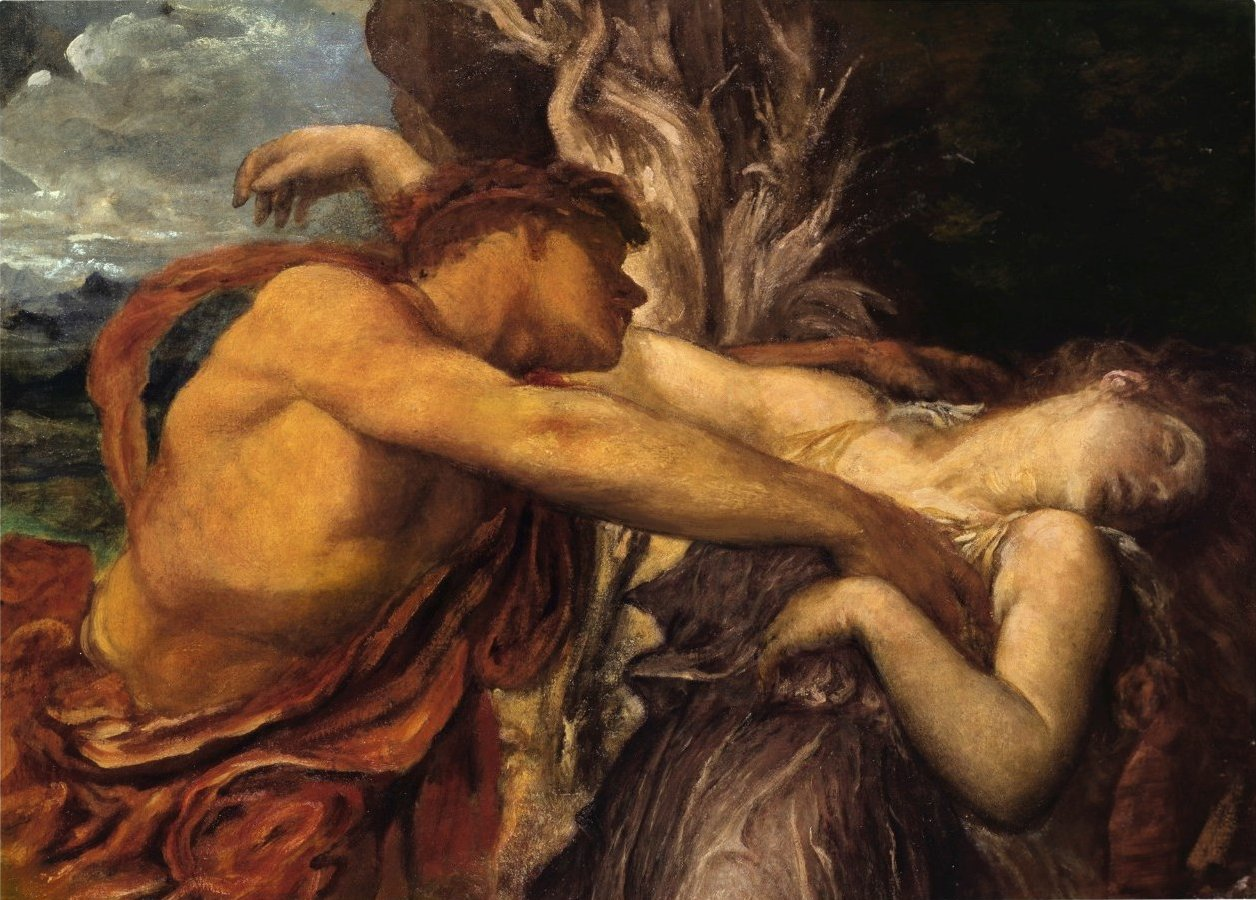
Orpheus And Eurydice

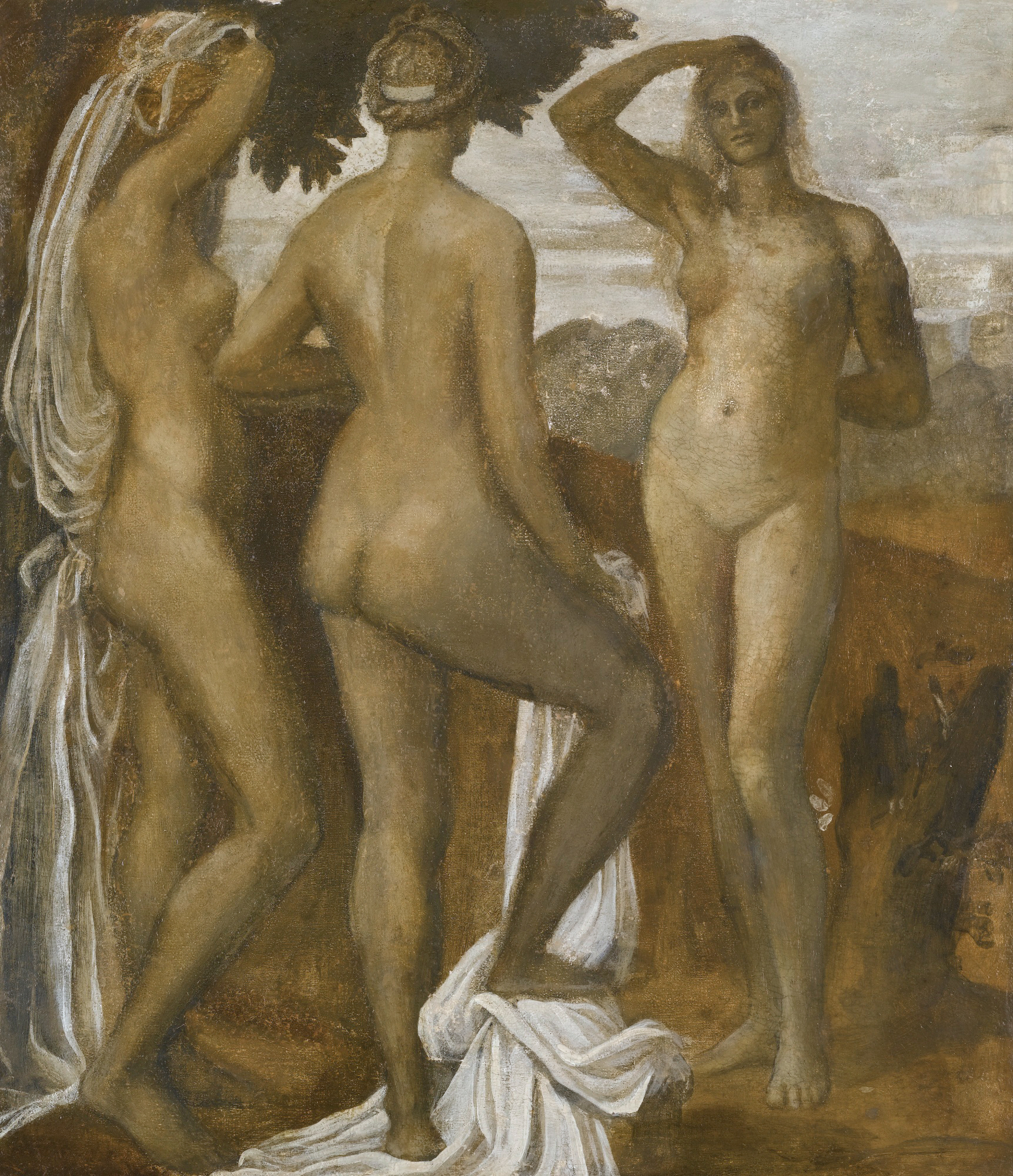
The Judgement of Paris

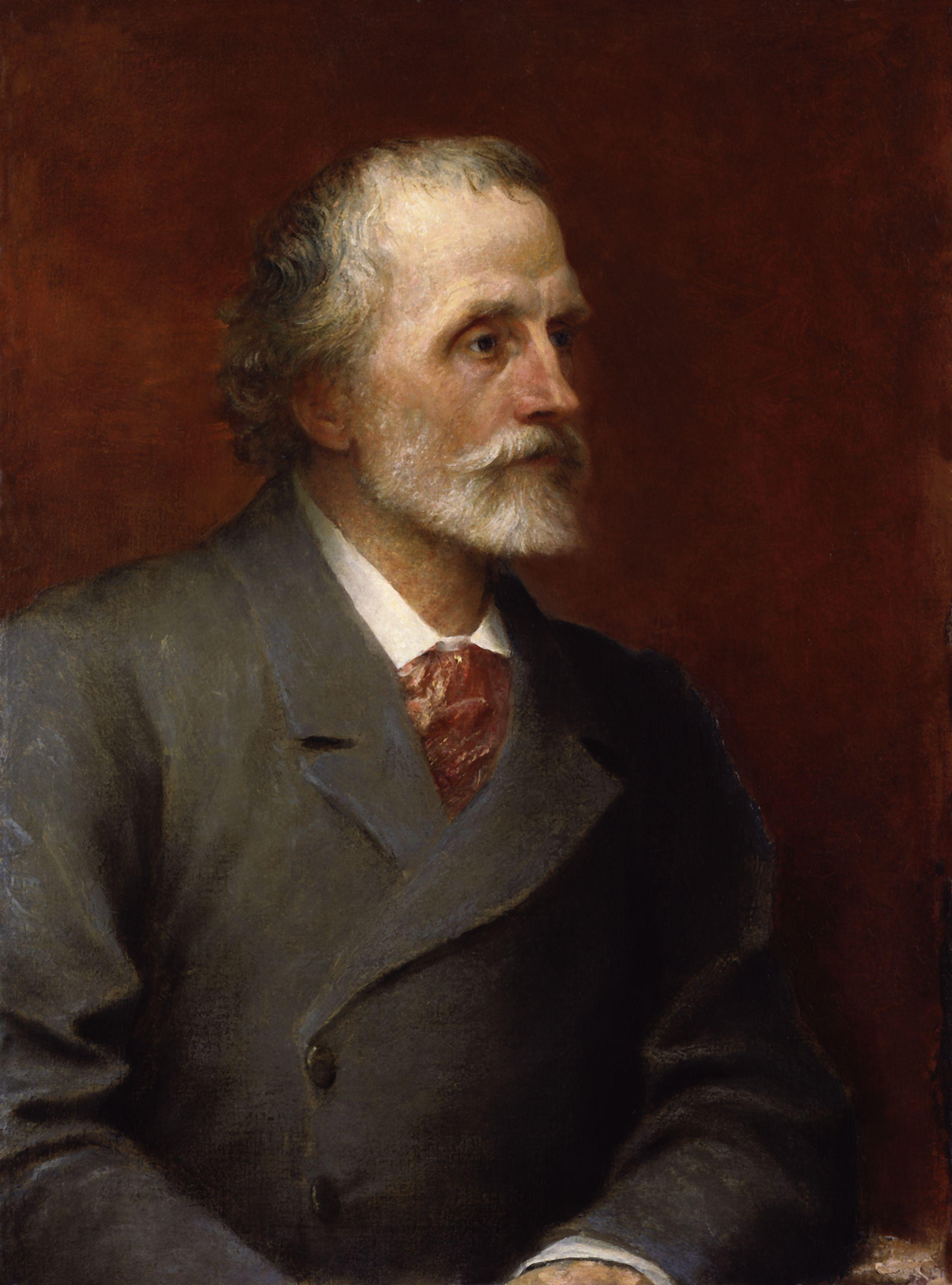
Portrait of George Meredith

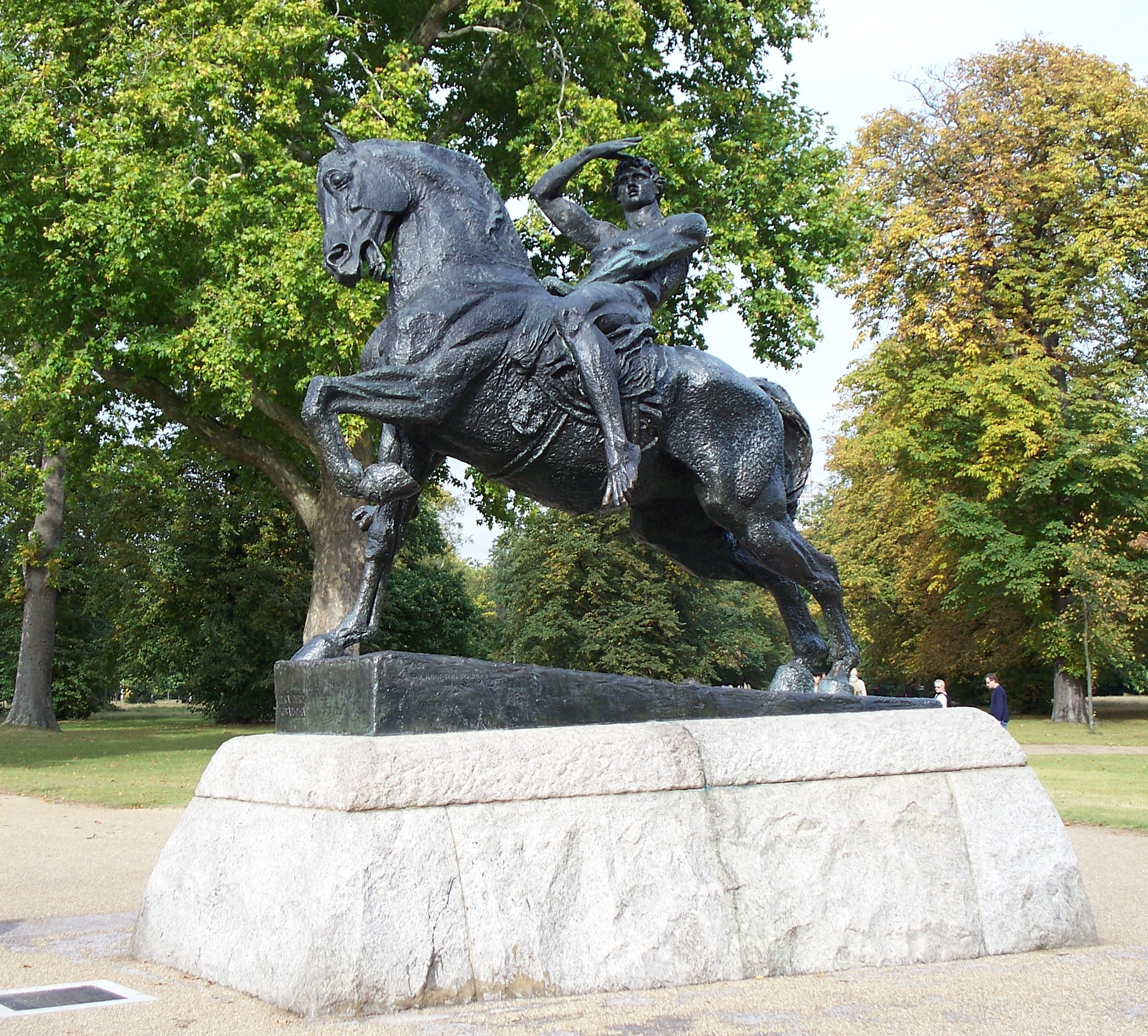
Physical Energy

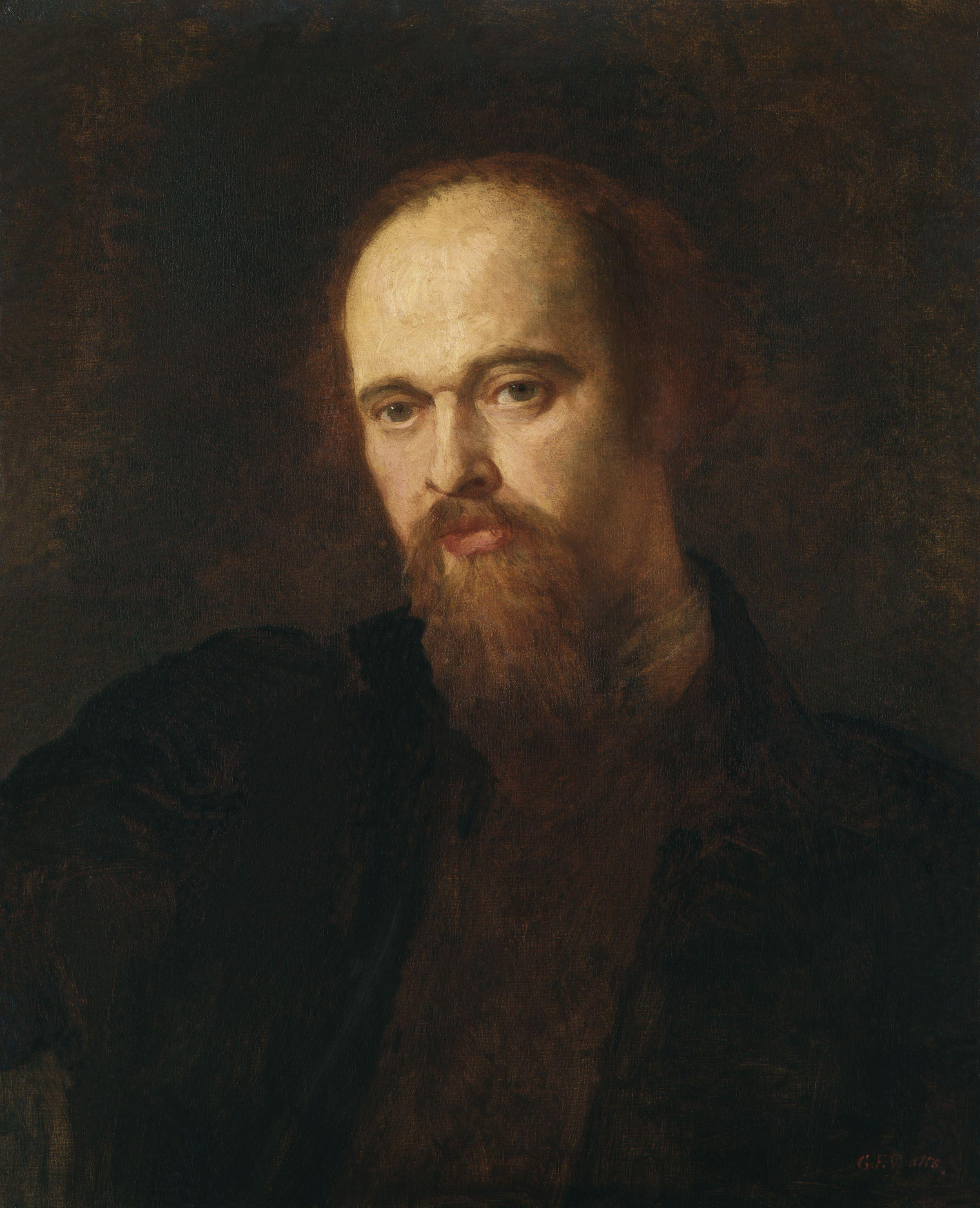
Dante Gabriel Rossetti

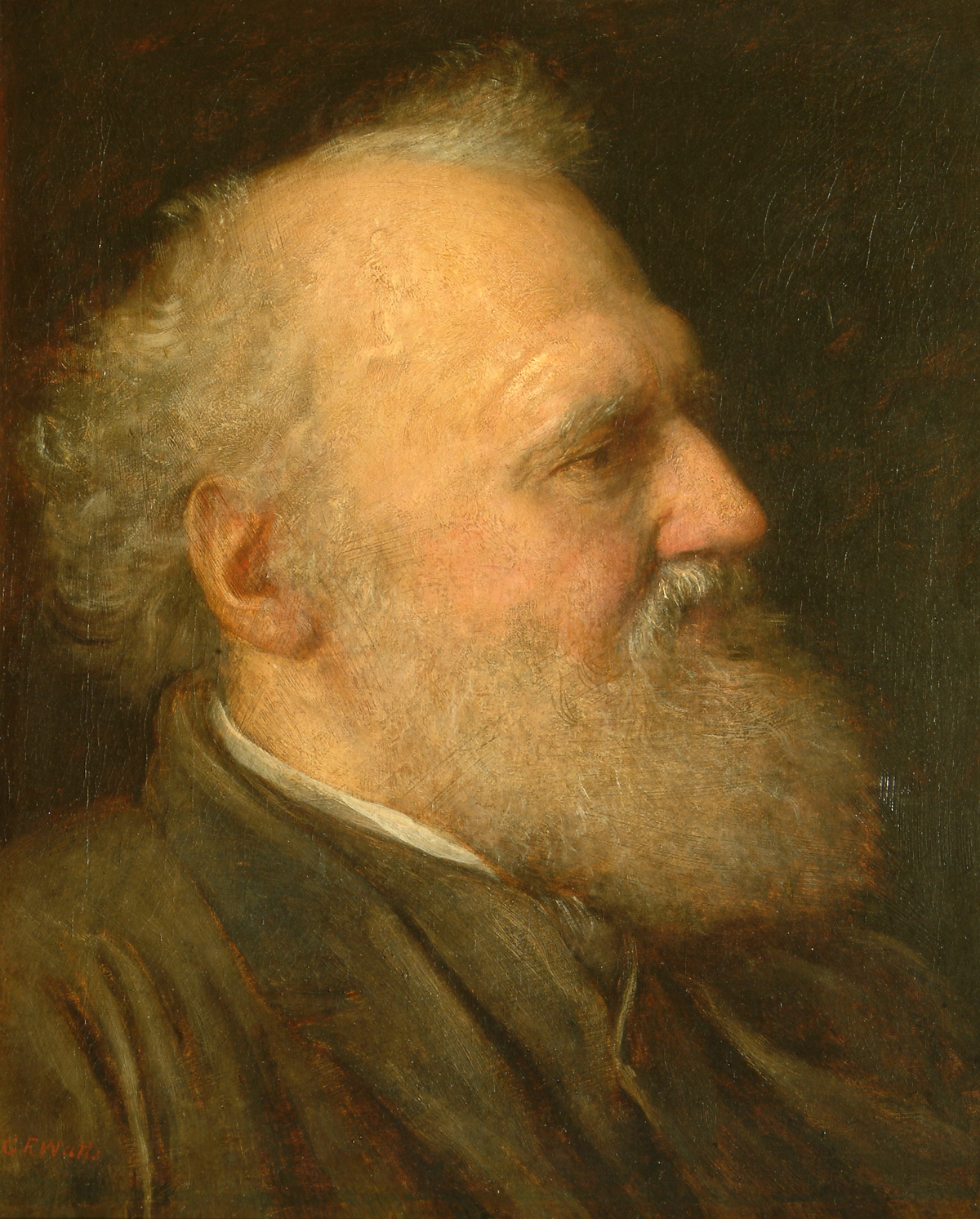
Henry Thoby Prinsep

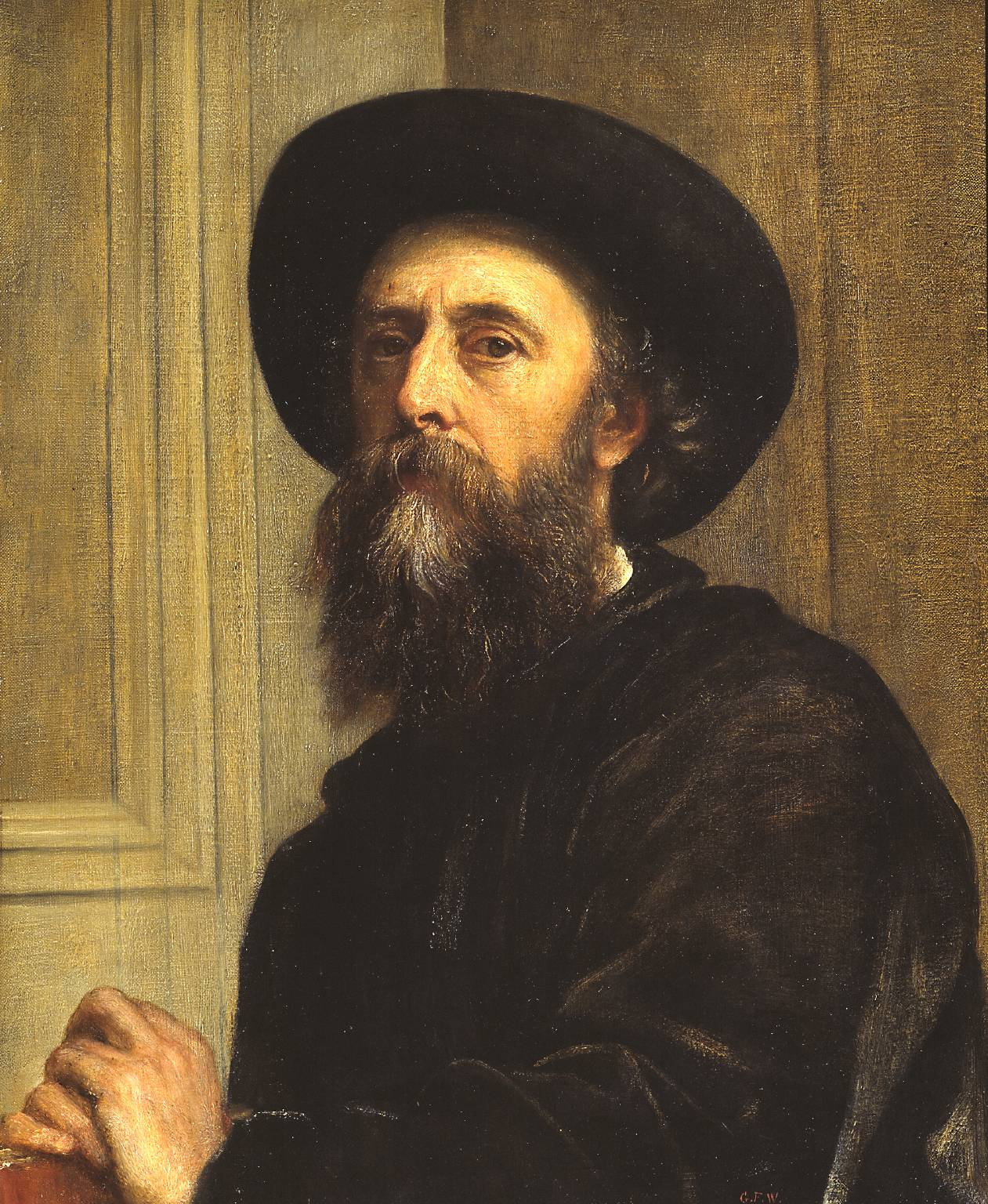
Self-Portrait, 1864

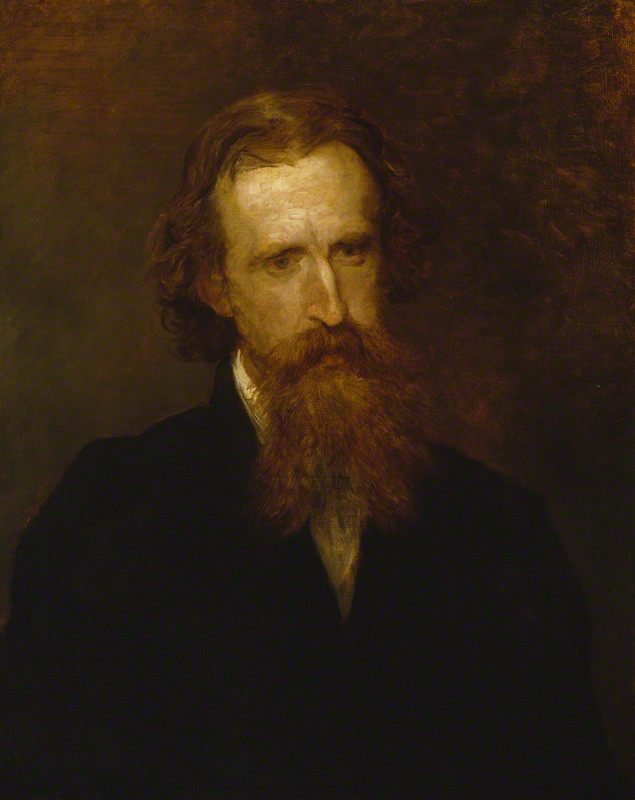
Sir Leslie Stephen, 1878

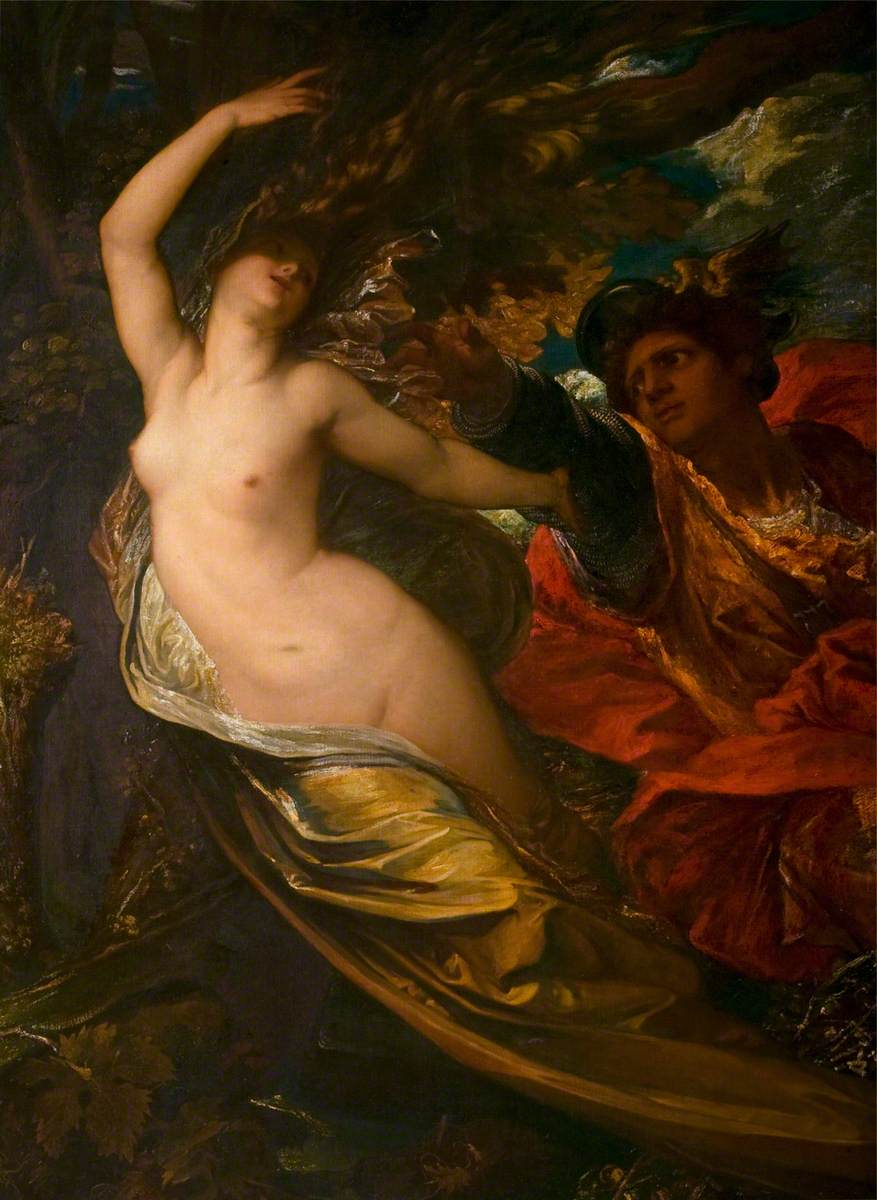
Orlando Pursuing the Fata Morgana, 1848

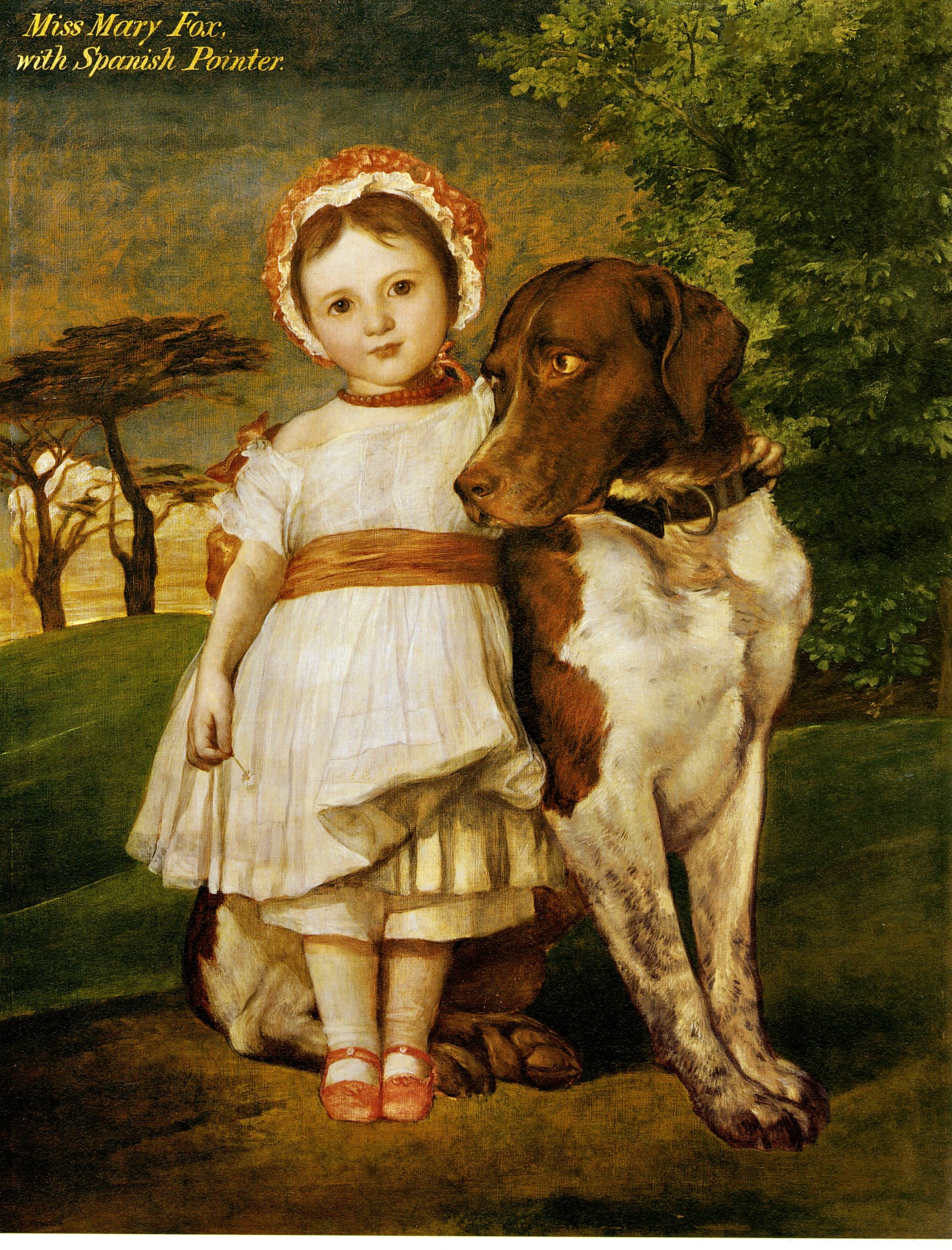
Miss Mary Fox, with Spanish Pointer, c. 1854

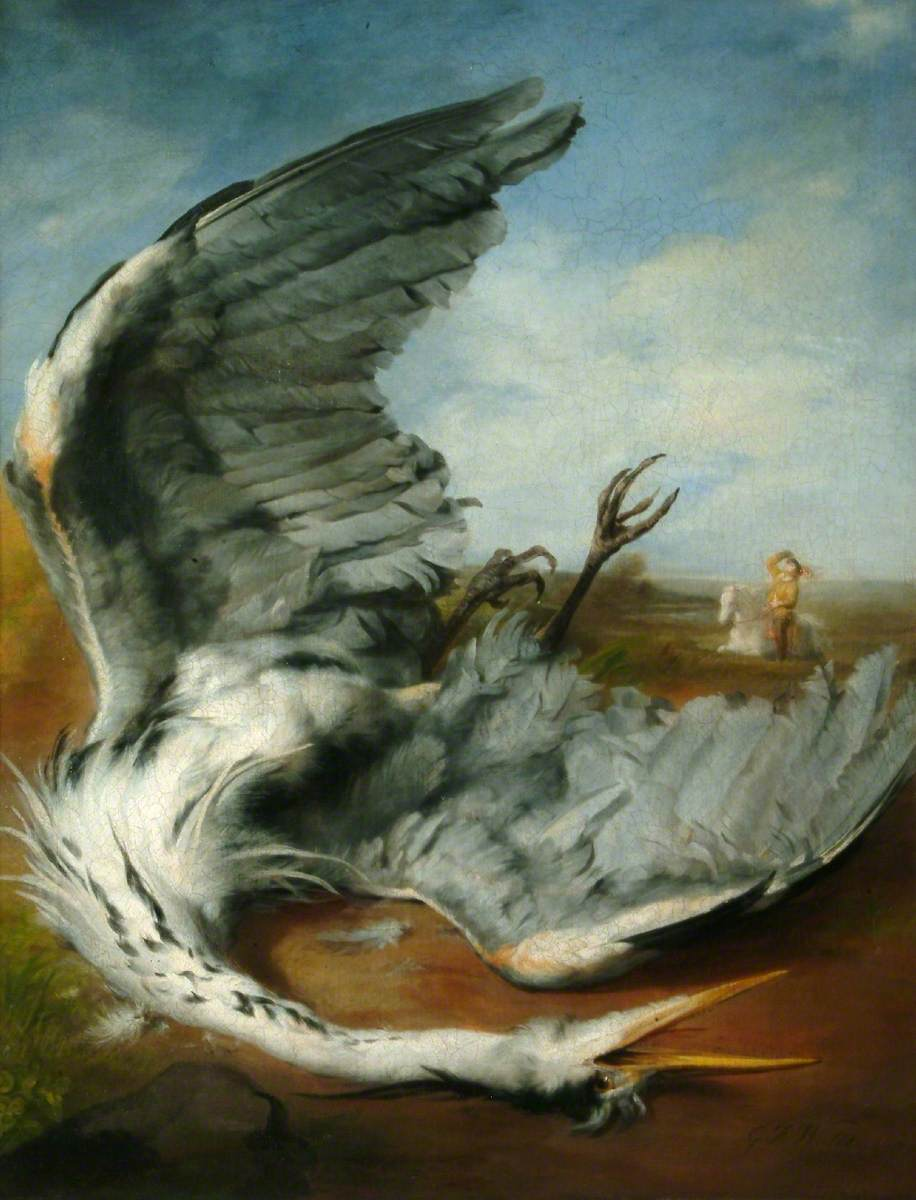
The Wounded Heron, 1837 (Watts Gallery)

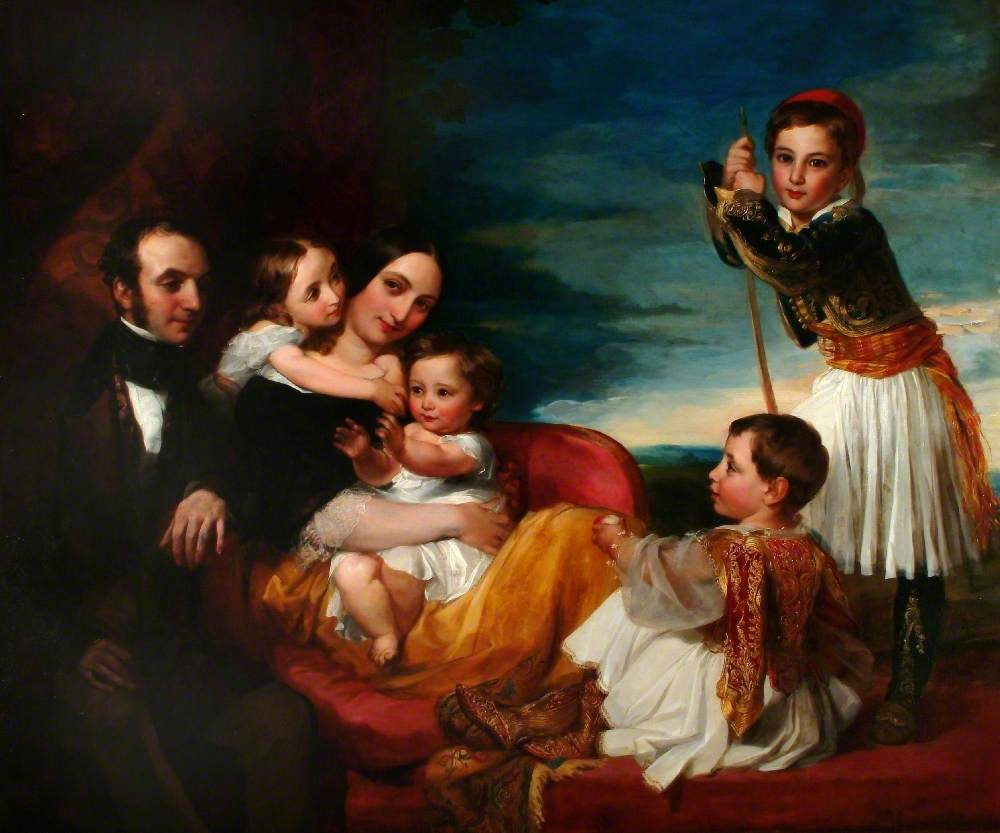
The Ionides Family, 1840

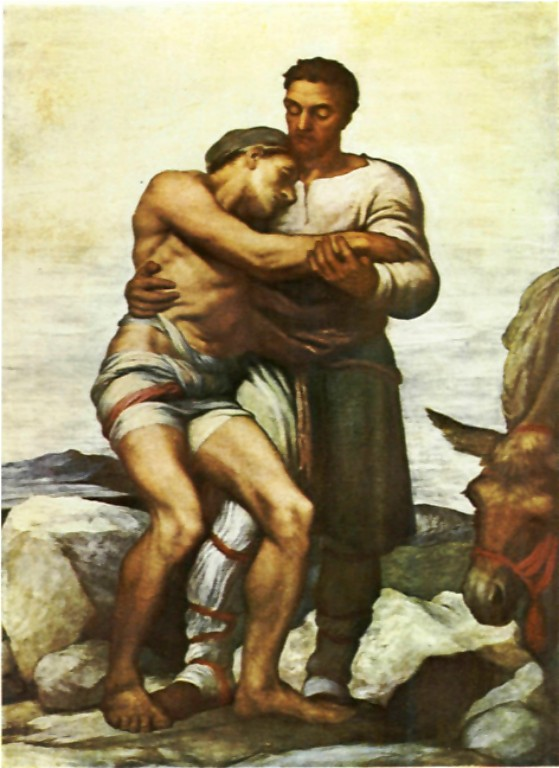
The Good Samaritan

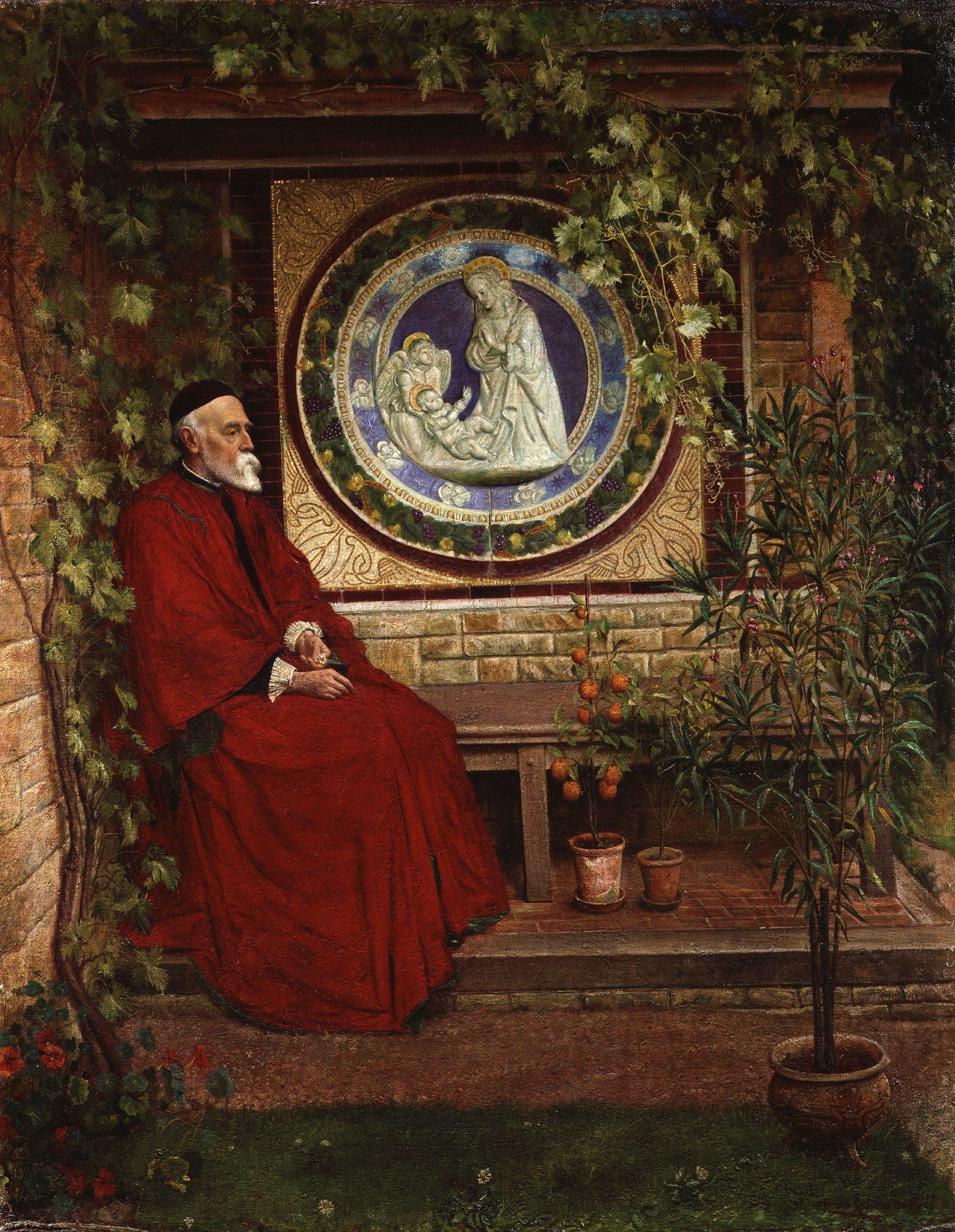
Portrait by L. R. Deuchars

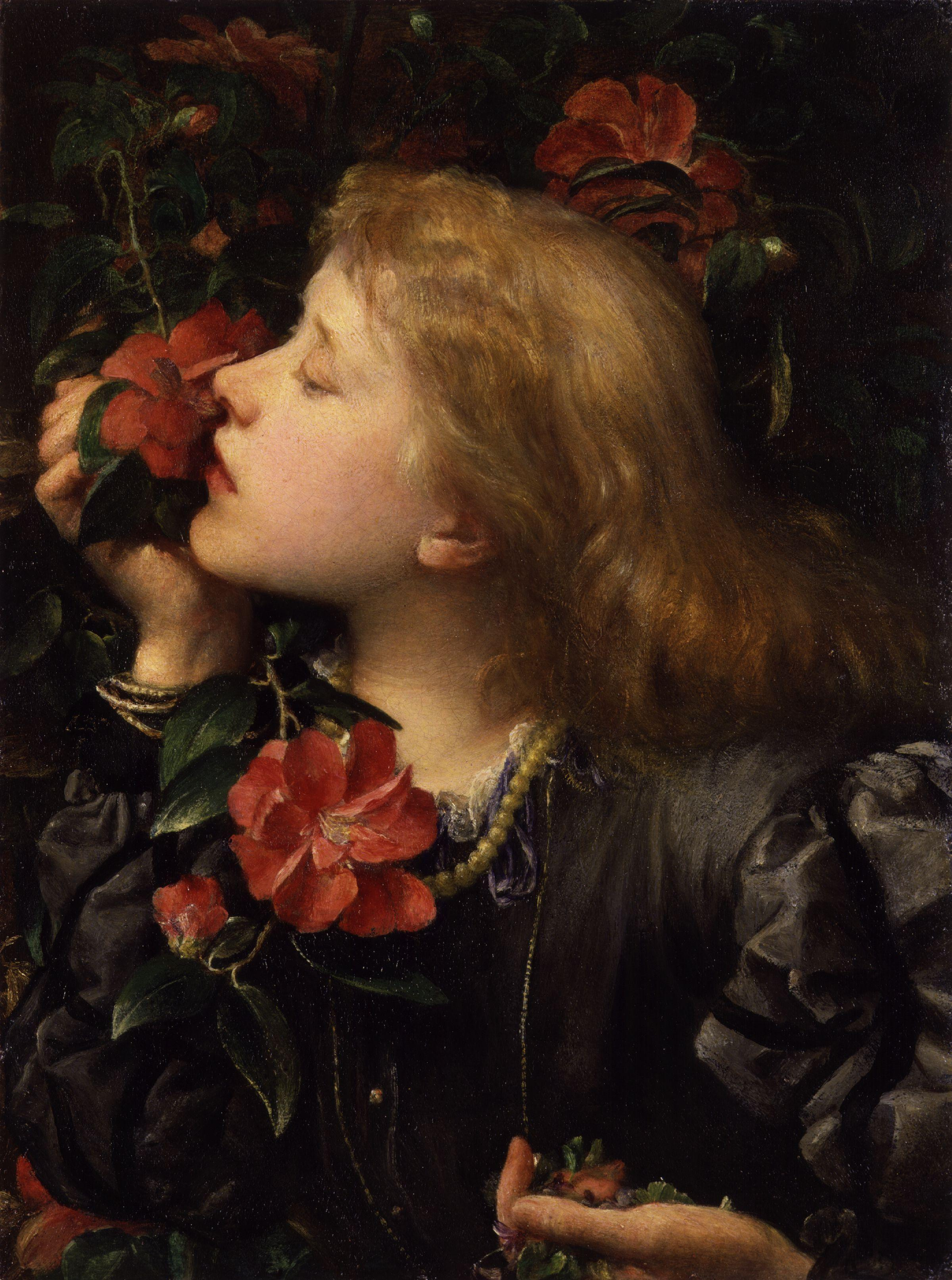
Choosing (Ellen Terry), ca. 1864

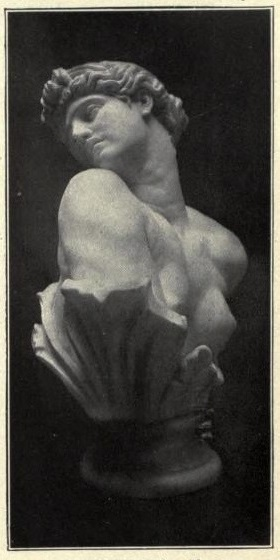
The bust of Clytie

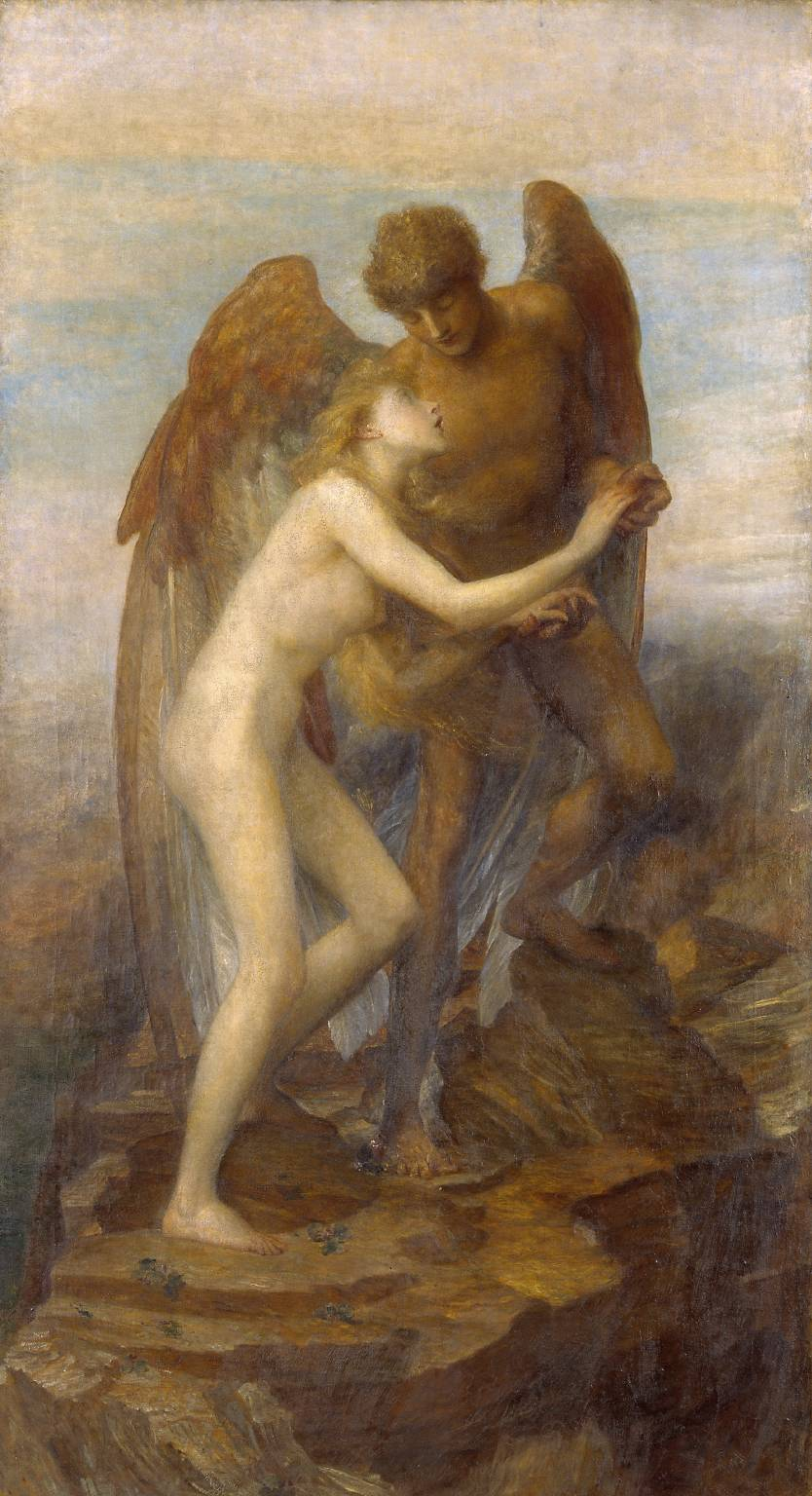
Love and Life (c. 1884-1885)

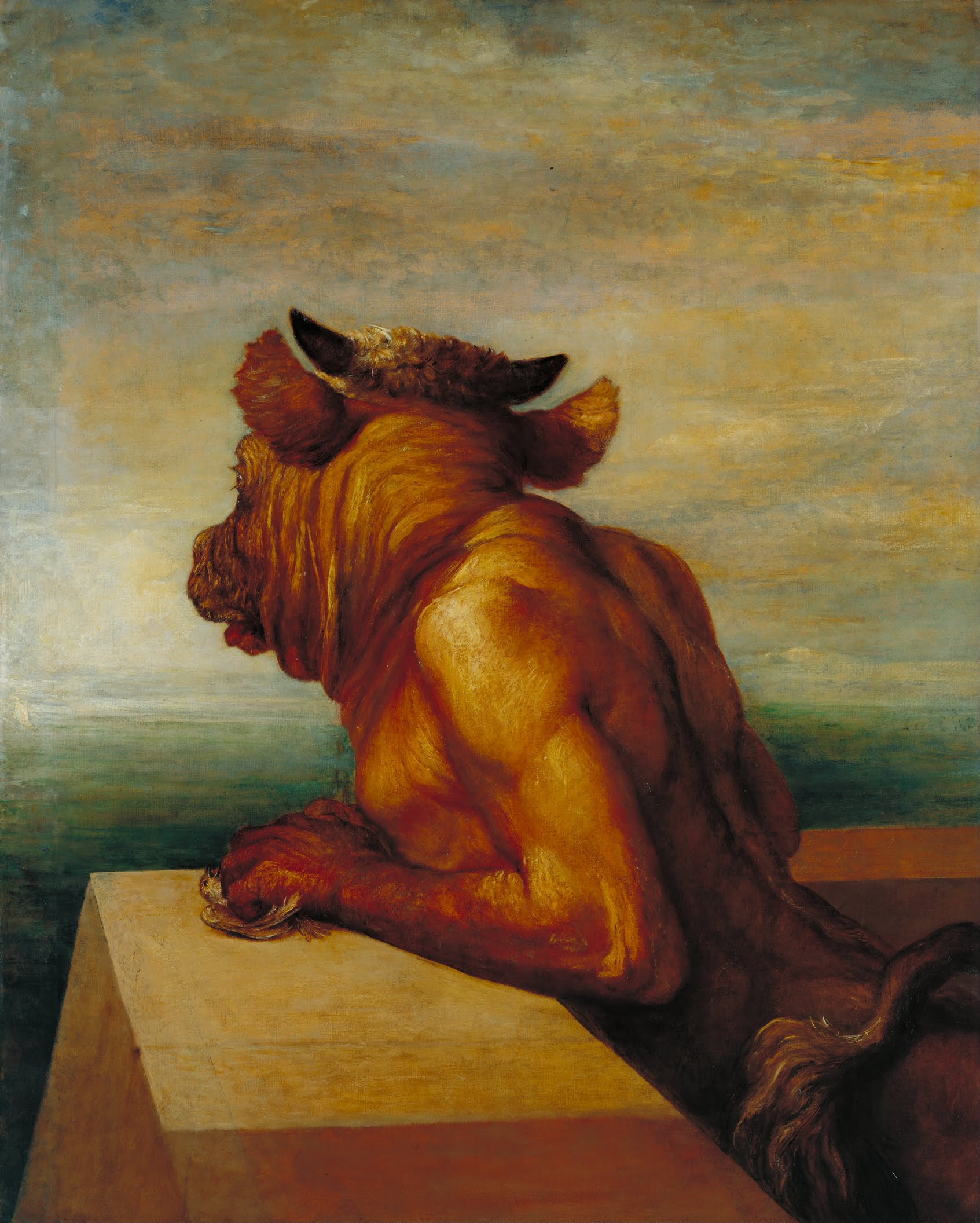
The Minotaur, 1885

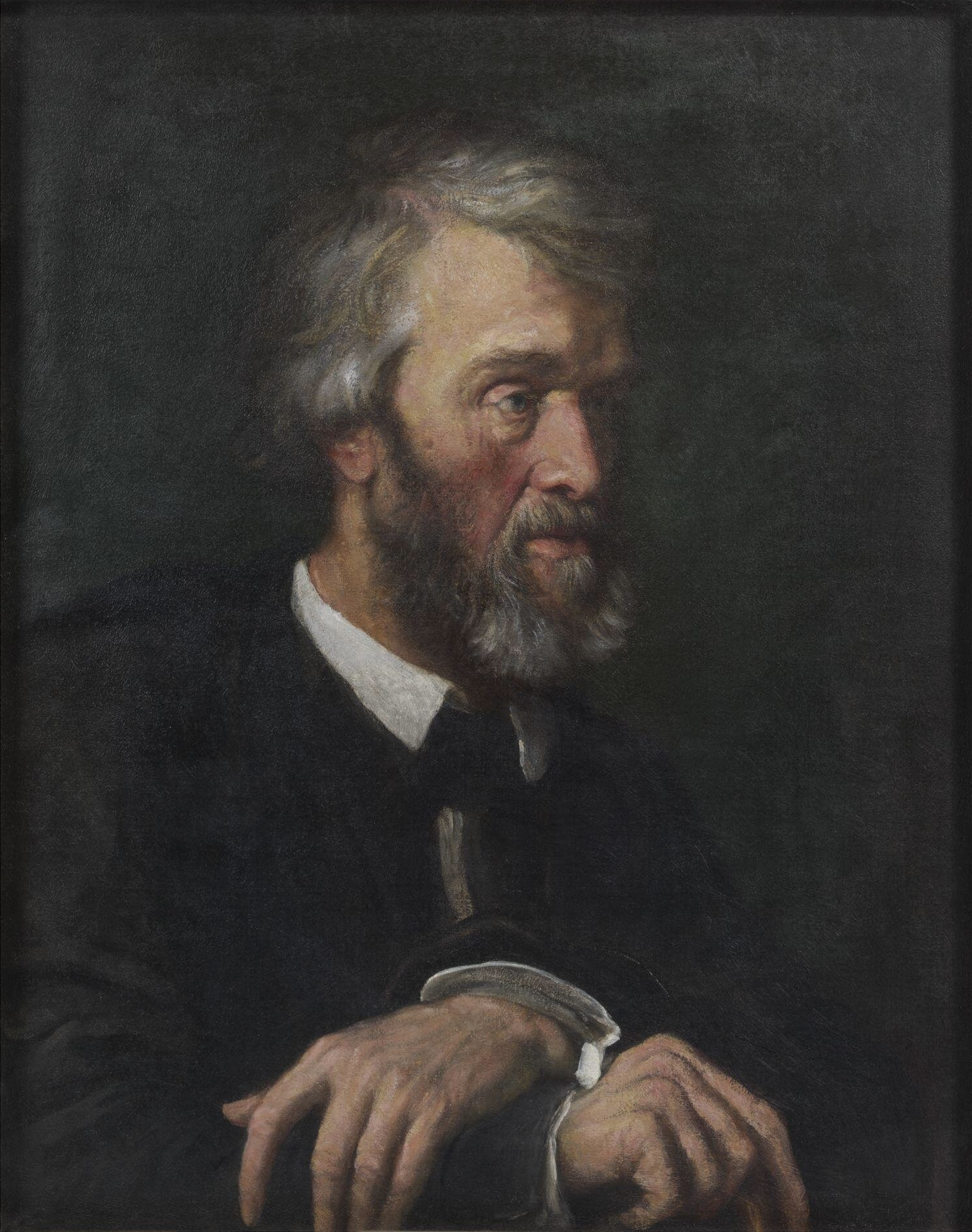
Portrait of Thomas Carlyle

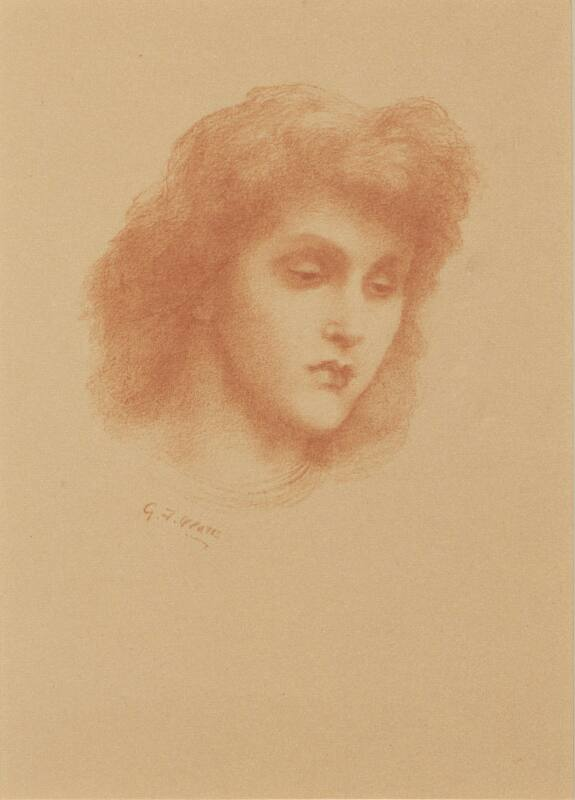
A Study of a Head - Aberdeen Archives, Gallery and Museums

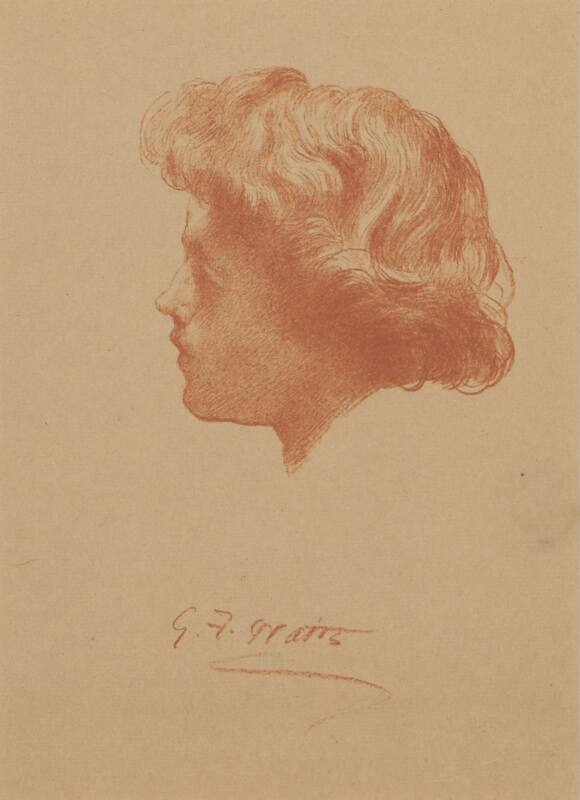
A Study of a Head - Aberdeen Archives, Gallery and Museums

== Bibliography ==
- This includes a longer list of his portraits and an extended critical summary of his art.
- England's Michelangelo: A Biography of George Frederic Watts (1975) by Wilfrid Blunt, Hamish Hamilton.
- Discovering the Sculptures of George Frederick Watts O.M., R.A. (1994) by Elizabeth Hutchings, Hunnyhill. ISBN 0-9521939-6-5
- The Laurel and the Thorn; A Study of G. F. Watts (1945) by Ronald Chapman, Faber and Faber Ltd.
- The Art of G. F. Watts (2017) by Nicholas Tromans, Paul Holberton Publishing. ISBN 1-9113000-7-5
- G. F. Watts Portraits: Fame and Beauty in Victorian Society (2004) by Barbara Bryant, NPG. ISBN 1-8551434-7-X
- G. F. Watts: The Last Great Victorian (2004) by Veronica Franklin Gould, Yale University Press. ISBN 0-3001057-7-0
