= Charles Barrington =

Charles Barrington may refer to:

- Charles Barrington (mountaineer), (1834–1901), Irish mountaineer
- Sir Charles Barrington, 5th Baronet (c. 1671–1715), English MP and Vice-Admiral of Essex
- Sir Charles Burton Barrington, 5th Baronet (1848–1943) of the Barrington baronets of Limerick
- Sir Charles Bacon Barrington, 6th Baronet (1902–1980) of the Barrington baronets of Limerick

== See also ==
- Charles Barrington Balfour (1862–1921), British army officer and politician
