= William Barrington =

William Barrington may refer to:

- William Barrington (English politician), English MP for St Germans 1588–1589
- William Barrington, 2nd Viscount Barrington (1717–1793), British MP for Berwick and for Plymouth, Secretary at War and Chancellor of the Exchequer
- William Barrington, 6th Viscount Barrington (1793–1867), British MP for Berkshire, chairman of Great Western Railway
- William Barrington (diplomat) (1842–1922), his son, British Ambassador to Argentine and Sweden
- William Barrington (Irish politician) (1857–1937), Irish Member of the Seanad Éireann 1922–1931

== See also ==
- William Barrington-Coupe (1931–2014), British record producer
