= Barrington Boardman =

American historian (1933–2004)

Barrington Boardman (May 31, 1933 – September 27, 2004) was an American author best known for his work From Harding to Hiroshima: An Anecdotal History of the United States From 1923 to 1945, which was published in 1987.

== Life ==
Boardman was born May 31, 1933, in Bridgeport, Connecticut. He was the son of Bradford and Virginia Boardman. Boardman attended Yale University where he earned his B.A. in 1955. From 1955 to 1957, Boardman served in the United States Army where he achieved the rank of sergeant.

In November 1958, Boardman married Ethel Nes. The couple adopted one child in 1963. Ethel died of cancer in December 1969. In 1971 Boardman remarried to Sandra Dixon McDonnell who brought three children to the marriage.

Boardman died on September 27, 2004.

== Career ==
Boardman was the senior vice president Ted Bates and Co. from 1962 to 1969. He was a co-founder of North Castle Partners, an advertising firm based in Stamford, CT.

Boardman's first writing was From Harding to Hiroshima: An Anecdotal History of the United States From 1923 to 1945 which was published in 1987 under the rubric "Isaac Asimov presents", and later re-released under the name Flappers, Bootleggers, "Typhoid Mary" and the Bomb in 1989. It was praised by the Chicago Tribune for being "full of trivia - but the kind of trivia that sticks in the mind and triggers detailed recall of the important events the book describes". The Kentucky New Era called it a "sheer delight". The Calhoun Times found that many of the anecdotes were already well-known but praised Boardman's one-liners.
