= George Barrington (disambiguation) =

George Barrington (1755–1804) was an Irish pickpocket and later a policeman.

George Barrington may also refer to:

- George Barrington (cricketer) (1857–1942), English cricketer
- George Barrington (Royal Navy officer) (1794–1835), British naval officer and Whig politician
- George Barrington, 5th Viscount Barrington (1761–1829), British minister and aristocrat
- George Barrington, 7th Viscount Barrington (1824–1886), British Conservative politician
