= Health effects of electronic cigarettes =

Nicotine electronic cigarettes (“e-cigs” or “vapes”) can damage people's health, especially children's, but are far less harmful than smoking. Electronic cigarettes increase the risk of asthma and chronic obstructive pulmonary disease (COPD) compared to not using nicotine at all. Pregnant women vaping may increase the risk of their children suffering from asthma and COPD. Vaping is associated with heart failure, and can cause seizures. Unregulated or modified e-cigs or liquids may be more dangerous than those whose production is well-regulated. Misuse, accidents, and product malfunction issues increase risks such as nicotine poisoning, contact with liquid nicotine, and severe burns.

Some of the most common but less serious adverse effects include abdominal pain, headache, blurry vision, throat and mouth irritation, vomiting, nausea, and coughing. People can become dependant on vapes. Nicotine is addictive and harmful to fetuses, children, and young people. However vaping while pregnant is less dangerous than smoking while pregnant. Passive e-cigarette vapor exposure may be harmful to children, but more studies are needed as of 2026.

Adverse effects of vaping

Randomized controlled trials have provided "high-certainty" evidence that e-cigarettes containing nicotine are more effective than nicotine replacement therapy for discontinuing tobacco smoking, and moderate‐certainty evidence that they are more effective than e-cigarettes free of nicotine.

== Harm reduction ==
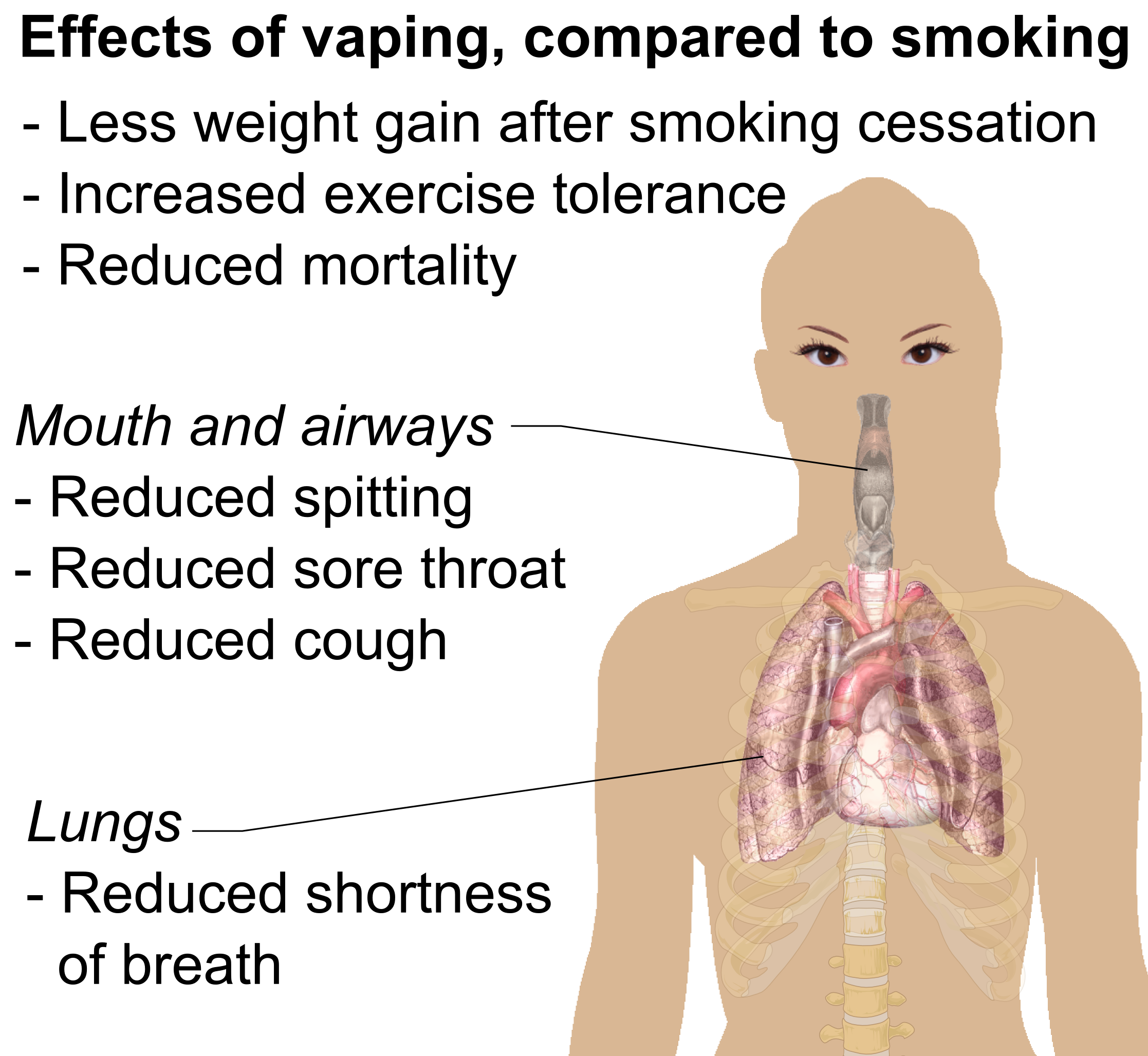
Effects of vaping, compared to tobacco smoking

When a person does not want to quit nicotine, harm reduction means striving to eliminate exposure to smoke by replacing it with vaping. E-cigarettes can reduce smokers' exposure to carcinogens and other toxic chemicals found in tobacco.

Tobacco harm reduction has been a controversial area of tobacco control. Health advocates have been slow to support a harm reduction method out of concern that tobacco companies cannot be trusted to sell products that will lower the risks associated with tobacco use. A large number of smokers want to reduce harm from smoking by instead using e-cigarettes. Quitting smoking is the most effective strategy for tobacco harm reduction.

Tobacco smoke contains 100 known carcinogens and 900 potentially cancer-causing chemicals, but e-cigarette vapor contains fewer potential carcinogens than tobacco smoke. A 2025 review of 39 studies found "no significant incident or prevalent risk" of cancer from vaping. Due to their similarity to traditional cigarettes, e-cigarettes could play a valuable role in tobacco harm reduction. The public health community remains divided concerning the appropriateness of endorsing a device whose safety and efficacy for smoking cessation remain unclear. Overall, the available evidence supports the cautionary implementation of harm reduction interventions aimed at promoting e-cigarettes as attractive and competitive alternatives to cigarette smoking, while taking measures to protect vulnerable groups and individuals. An evidence review commissioned by England's Office for Health Improvement and Disparities (OHID) concluded that, in the short and medium term, vaping poses a small fraction of the risks of smoking, while noting that vaping is not risk-free for people who have never smoked.

Evidence to substantiate the potential of vaping to lower tobacco-related death and disease is unknown. E-cigarettes could have an influential role in tobacco harm reduction. One study's authors warned against the potential harm of excessive regulation and advised health professionals to consider advising smokers who are reluctant to quit by other methods to switch to e-cigarettes as a safer alternative to smoking.

== Smoking cessation ==
E-cigarettes can help people quit smoking, but only about one in ten quit. Limited evidence suggests that e-cigarettes likely do help people to stop smoking when used in clinical settings. However, more smokers become dual users than succeed in complete abstinence. Outside clinical settings, vaping does not greatly change the odds of quitting smoking.

The public health community is divided over the use of these devices to reduce or prevent smoking. As of 2017, they were not approved by the US Centers for Disease Control and Prevention (CDC) as a smoking cessation product, and in 2020, they became regulated as a tobacco product, despite not containing tobacco. However, a 2019 study reported that 10% of participants given nicotine via gum, mouth spray, patches, etc., quit smoking, while 18% of those given vaping kits quit. Among study participants still smoking, e-cigarette users smoked less. A 2021 review by Public Health England (PHE) reported vaping to be around 95% less harmful than smoking. E-cigarettes are estimated to have preserved 677,000 life–years in the US alone from 2011 to 2019.

A small number of studies have looked at whether using e-cigarettes reduces the number of cigarettes smokers consume. It is unclear whether e-cigarettes are only helpful for particular types of smokers. Vaping with nicotine may reduce tobacco use among daily smokers. Whether vaping is effective for quitting smoking may depend on whether it was used as part of an effort to quit.

Evidence suggests smokers are more frequently able to completely quit smoking using tank devices compared to cigalikes, which may be due to their more efficient nicotine delivery. One study supports the claim that smokers are more likely to use e-cigarettes as a nicotine replacement product to aid in smoking cessation than other pharmaceutical products.

There is low-quality evidence that vaping assists smokers to quit smoking in the long-term compared with nicotine-free vaping. Tentative evidence indicates that health warnings on vaping products may influence users to give up vaping.

There is robust evidence that vaping is not effective for quitting smoking among adolescents. In view of the shortage of evidence, vaping is not recommend for cancer patients, although for all patients vaping is likely less dangerous than smoking cigarettes. The effectiveness of vaping for quitting smoking among vulnerable groups is uncertain.

== Safety ==
Ecigs are harmful to children, but there is no consensus on the risks of e-cigarette use by adults. There is little data about their safety, and a considerable variety of liquids are used as carriers, and thus are present in the aerosol delivered to the user. One 2025 study found no serious respiratory effects, whereas another found that vaping is associated with chronic obstructive pulmonary disease but less so than smoking. Regulated US FDA products such as nicotine inhalers may be safer than e-cigarettes, but e-cigarettes are safer than combusted tobacco products such as cigarettes.

The risk of early death is anticipated to be similar to that of smokeless tobacco. Since vapor does not contain tobacco and does not involve combustion, users may avoid several harmful constituents usually found in tobacco smoke, such as ash, tar, and carbon monoxide. However, e-cigarette use with or without nicotine cannot be considered risk-free because the long-term effects of e-cigarette use are unknown. There is "only limited evidence showing adverse respiratory and cardiovascular effects in humans", with the authors of a 2020 review calling for more long-term studies on the subject.

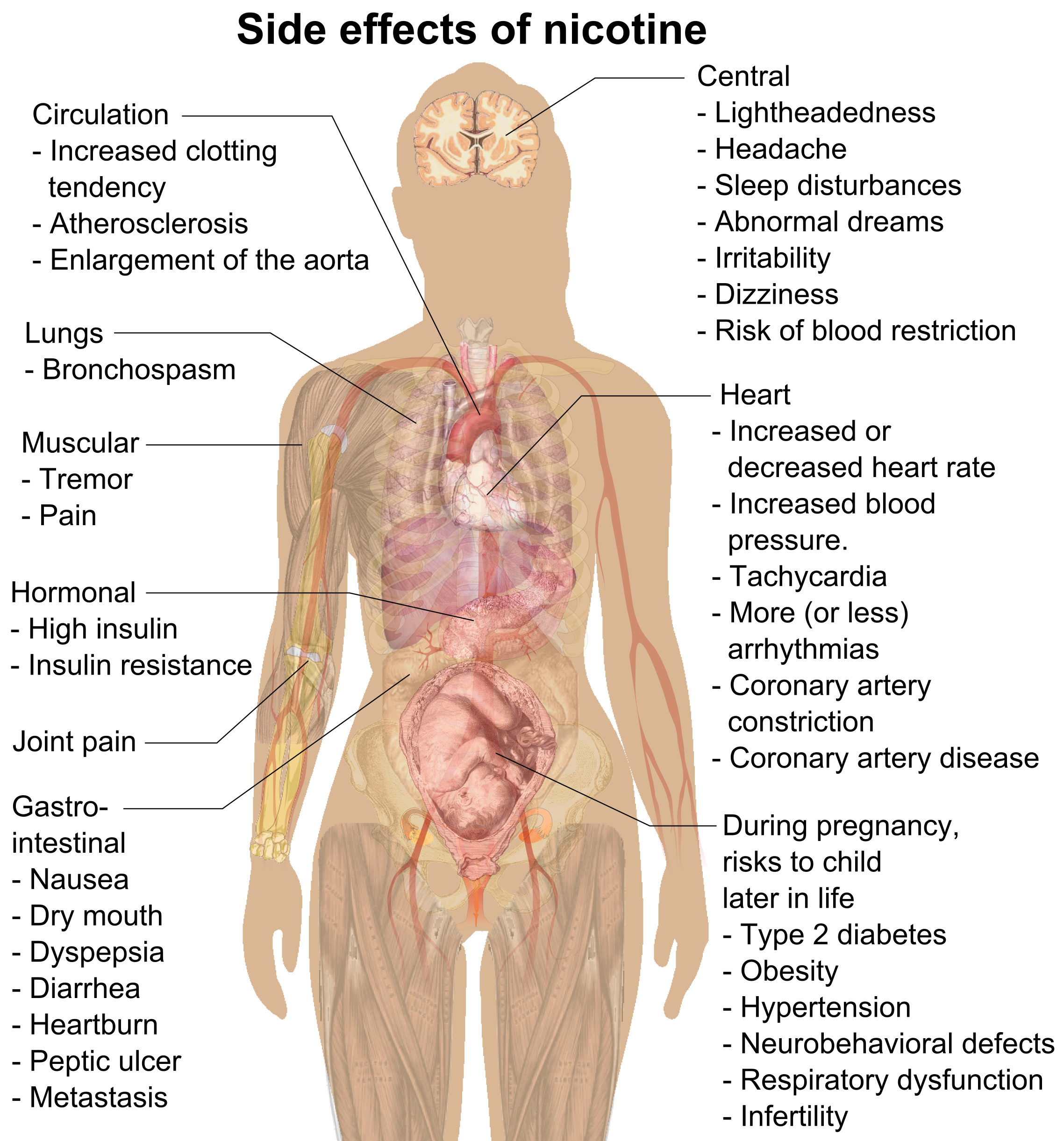
Possible side effects of nicotine

The cytotoxicity of e-liquids varies, and contamination with various chemicals have been detected in the liquid. Metal parts of e-cigarettes in contact with the e-liquid can contaminate it with metal particles.

Nicotine is associated with cardiovascular disease and poisoning, and possibly with birth defects. As of 2025, there is insufficient evidence of cancer caused directly by e-cigarettes.

In 2021, researchers at Johns Hopkins University reported over 2,000 unknown chemicals in the vape clouds that they tested from Vuse, Juul, Blu and Mi-Salt vape devices.

E-cigarettes create vapor that consists of fine and ultrafine particles of particulate matter, with the majority of particles in the ultrafine range. The vapor have been found to contain propylene glycol, glycerin, nicotine, flavors, small amounts of toxicants, and heavy metals, as well as metal nanoparticles, and other substances. Exactly what the vapor consists of varies in composition and concentration across and within manufacturers, and depends on the contents of the liquid, the physical and electrical design of the device, and user behavior, among other factors.

The majority of toxic chemicals found in cigarette smoke are absent in e-cigarette vapor. E-cigarette vapor contains lower concentrations of potentially toxic chemicals than with cigarette smoke. Those which are present, are mostly below 1% of the corresponding levels permissible by workplace safety standards. But workplace safety standards do not recognize exposure to certain vulnerable groups such as people with medical ailments, children, and infants who may be exposed to second-hand vapor.

== Addiction ==
Nicotine, a key ingredient in most e-liquids, (Note: Since 2016 the US Food and Drug Administration (US FDA) regulated e-cigarettes under the classification of tobacco products and labeled them as electronic nicotine delivery systems. A 2018 report commissioned by the US FDA decided to use the term e-cigarettes, indicating that for some use e-liquids containing no nicotine.) is well-recognized as one of the most addictive substances, as addictive as heroin and cocaine. Addiction is believed to be a disorder of experience-dependent brain plasticity. The reinforcing effects of nicotine play a significant role in the beginning and continuing use of the drug. First-time nicotine users develop a dependence about 32% of the time. Chronic nicotine use involves both psychological and physical dependence. Nicotine-containing e-cigarette vapor induces addiction-related neurochemical, physiological and behavioral changes. Nicotine affects neurological, neuromuscular, cardiovascular, respiratory, immunological and gastrointestinal systems.

Neuroplasticity within the brain's reward system occurs as a result of long-term nicotine use, leading to nicotine dependence. The neurophysiological activities that are the basis of nicotine dependence are intricate. It includes genetic components, age, gender, and the environment. Nicotine addiction is a disorder which alters different neural systems such as dopaminergic, glutamatergic, GABAergic, serotoninergic, that take part in reacting to nicotine. Long-term nicotine use affects a broad range of genes associated with neurotransmission, signal transduction, and synaptic architecture. The ability to quit smoking is affected by genetic factors, including genetically based differences in the way nicotine is metabolized.

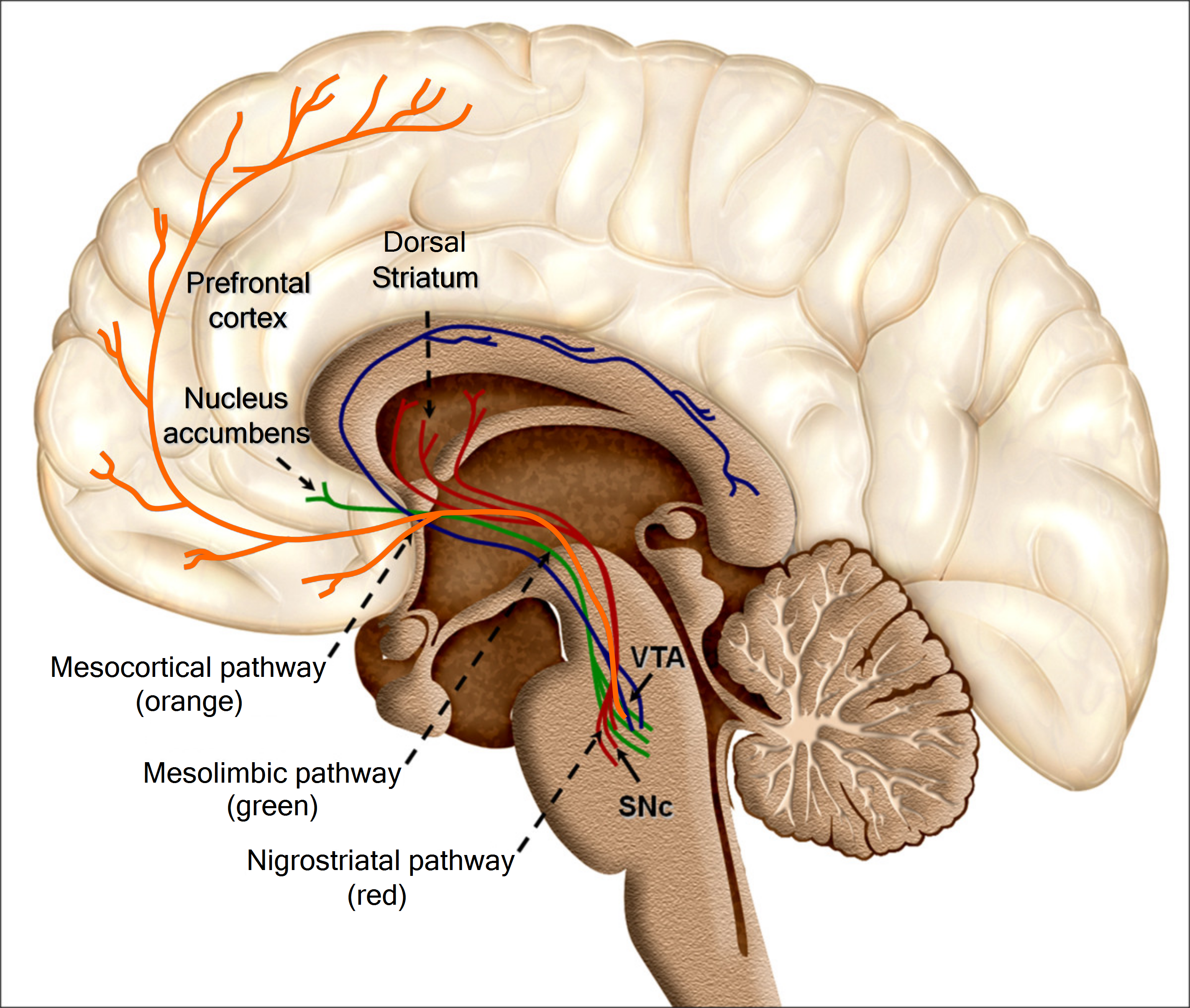
The reinforcing effects of addictive drugs, such as nicotine, are associated with its ability to excite the mesolimbic and dopaminergic systems. How does the nicotine in e-cigarettes affect the brain? Until about age 25, the brain is still growing. Each time a new memory is created or a new skill is learned, stronger connections – or synapses – are built between brain cells. Young people's brains build synapses faster than adult brains. Because addiction is a form of learning, adolescents can get addicted more easily than adults.

Nicotine is a parasympathomimetic stimulant that binds to and activates nicotinic acetylcholine receptors in the brain, which subsequently causes the release of dopamine and other neurotransmitters, such as norepinephrine, acetylcholine, serotonin, gamma-aminobutyric acid, glutamate, endorphins, and several neuropeptides, including proopiomelanocortin-derived α-MSH and adrenocorticotropic hormone. Corticotropin-releasing factor, Neuropeptide Y, orexins, and norepinephrine are involved in nicotine addiction. Continuous exposure to nicotine can cause an increase in the number of nicotinic receptors, which is believed to be a result of receptor desensitization and subsequent receptor upregulation.

Long-term exposure to nicotine can also result in downregulation of glutamate transporter 1. Long-term nicotine exposure upregulates cortical nicotinic receptors, but it also lowers the activity of the nicotinic receptors in the cortical vasodilation region. These effects are not easily understood. With constant use of nicotine, tolerance occurs at least partially as a result of the development of new nicotinic acetylcholine receptors in the brain.

After several months of nicotine abstinence, the number of receptors go back to normal. The extent to which alterations in the brain caused by nicotine use are reversible is not fully understood. Nicotine also stimulates nicotinic acetylcholine receptors in the adrenal medulla, resulting in increased levels of epinephrine and beta-endorphin.

When nicotine intake stops, the upregulated nicotinic acetylcholine receptors induce withdrawal symptoms. These symptoms can include cravings for nicotine, anger, irritability, anxiety, depression, impatience, trouble sleeping, restlessness, hunger, weight gain, and difficulty concentrating. When trying to quit smoking with vaping a base containing nicotine, symptoms of withdrawal can include irritability, restlessness, poor concentration, anxiety, depression, and hunger. The changes in the brain cause a nicotine user to feel abnormal when not using nicotine. In order to feel normal, the user has to keep his or her body supplied with nicotine. E-cigarettes may reduce cigarette craving and withdrawal symptoms.

The addiction potential of e-cigarettes may have risen because as they have progressed, they have delivered nicotine better.

The National Institute on Drug Abuse said e-cigarettes could maintain nicotine addiction in those who are attempting to quit. The limited available data suggests that the likelihood of excessive use of e-cigarettes is smaller than traditional cigarettes. No long-term studies have been done on the effectiveness of e-cigarettes in treating tobacco addiction, but some evidence suggests that dual use of e-cigarettes and traditional cigarettes may be associated with greater nicotine dependence.

Adolescents are likely to underestimate nicotine's addictiveness. Vulnerability to the brain-modifying effects of nicotine, along with youthful experimentation with e-cigarettes, could lead to a lifelong addiction. A long-term nicotine addiction from using a vape may result in using other tobacco products. The majority of addiction to nicotine starts during youth and young adulthood. Adolescents are more likely to become nicotine dependent than adults.

The adolescent brain seems to be particularly sensitive to neuroplasticity as a result of nicotine. Minimal exposure could be enough to produce neuroplastic alterations in the very sensitive adolescent brain. A 2014 review found that in studies up to a third of young people who have not tried a traditional cigarette have used e-cigarettes. The degree to which teens are using e-cigarettes in ways the manufacturers did not intend, such as increasing the nicotine delivery, is unknown, as is the extent to which e-cigarette use may lead to addiction or substance dependence in young people.

In 2025 Alder Hey Children's Hospital set up the first NHS clinic for vape addiction in children. In the United States, the 2024 National Youth Tobacco Survey found that current e-cigarette use among middle and high school students declined from 2.13 million students, or 7.7%, in 2023 to 1.63 million students, or 5.9%, in 2024, about one-third of the number reported at the 2019 peak.

== Positions ==
Medical organizations differ in their views about the health implications of vaping. There is general agreement that e-cigarettes expose users to fewer toxicants than tobacco cigarettes. Some healthcare groups and policy makers have hesitated to recommend e-cigarettes for quitting smoking, because of limited evidence of effectiveness and safety. Some have advocated bans on e-cigarette sales and others have suggested that e-cigarettes may be regulated as tobacco products but with less nicotine content or be regulated as a medicinal product.

A 2019 World Health Organization (WHO) report found that the scientific evidence is insufficient to support vaping as a smoking cessation tool. Healthcare organizations in the UK (including the Royal College of Physicians and Public Health England) have encouraged smokers to switch to e-cigarettes or other nicotine replacements if they cannot quit, as this would potentially save millions of lives.

In 2016, the US Food and Drug Administration (US FDA) stated that "Although ENDS [electronic nicotine delivery systems] may potentially provide cessation benefits to individual smokers, no ENDS have been approved as effective cessation aids." In 2019 the European Respiratory Society stated that "[t]he tobacco harm reduction strategy is based on well-meaning but incorrect or undocumented claims or assumptions."

The scientific community in the United States and Europe are primarily concerned with the possible effect of electronic cigarette use on public health. There is concern among public health experts that e-cigarettes could renormalize smoking, weaken measures to control tobacco, and serve as a gateway for smoking among youth. The public health community is divided over whether to support e-cigarettes, because their safety and efficacy for quitting smoking is unclear. Many in the public health community acknowledge the potential for their quitting smoking and decreasing harm benefits, but there remains a concern over their long-term safety and potential for a new era of users to get addicted to nicotine and then tobacco. There is concern among tobacco control academics and advocates that prevalent universal vaping "will bring its own distinct but as yet unknown health risks in the same way tobacco smoking did, as a result of chronic exposure", among other things.

Medical organizations avoid releasing statements about the relative toxicity of electronic cigarettes because of the many different device types, liquid formulations, and new devices that come onto the market. Some healthcare groups and policy makers have hesitated to recommend e-cigarettes with nicotine for quitting smoking, despite some evidence of effectiveness (when compared to Nicotine Replacement Therapy or e-cigarettes without nicotine) and safety. Reasons for hesitancy include challenges ensuring that quality control measures on the devices and liquids are met, unknown second hand vapour inhalation effects, uncertainty about EC use leading to the initiation of smoking or effects on people new to smoking who develop nicotine dependence, unknown long-term effects of electronic cigarette use on human health, uncertainty about the effects of ECs on smoking regulations and smoke free legislation measures, and uncertainty about involvement of the tobacco industry.

Some have advocated bans on e-cigarette sales and others have suggested that e-cigarettes may be regulated as tobacco products but with less nicotine content or be regulated as a medicinal product. A 2016 World Health Organization (WHO) report found that the scientific evidence for the effectiveness of vaping for quitting smoking is "scant and of low certainty". In 2016, the US Food and Drug Administration (FDA) stated that "Although ENDS [electronic nicotine delivery systems] may potentially provide cessation benefits to individual smokers, no ENDS have been approved as effective cessation aids." In 2019 the European Respiratory Society stated that "The long-term effects of ECIG use are unknown, and there is therefore no evidence that ECIGs are safer than tobacco in the long term." Following hundreds of possible cases of severe lung illness and five confirmed deaths associated with vaping in the US, the Centers for Disease Control and Prevention stated on September 6, 2019, that people should consider not using vaping products while their investigation is ongoing.

=== International ===
In August 2016, a report produced by the World Health Organization (WHO) for the Conference of the Parties to the WHO Framework Convention on Tobacco Control, found "there is not enough research to quantify the relative risk of ENDS/ENNDS over combustible products. Therefore, no specific figure about how much 'safer' the use of these products is compared to smoking can be given any scientific credibility at this time."

In May 2018, the Forum of International Respiratory Societies released a position statement, stating "ENDS are devices that deliver aerosols of nicotine and other volatile chemicals to the lung. Their use has rapidly escalated among youths and they are now the most commonly used tobacco product among adolescents. Initiation of electronic cigarette use is strongly associated with the subsequent initiation of combustible tobacco product use among adolescents."

=== Australia ===
In 2020 the Royal Australian College of General Practitioners updated their advice on smoking cessation, stating that "for people who have tried to achieve smoking cessation with approved pharmacotherapies but failed, but who are still motivated to quit smoking and have brought up e-cigarette usage with their healthcare practitioner, nicotine-containing e-cigarettes may be a reasonable intervention to recommend."

=== Canada ===
Health Canada states in relation to the Tobacco and Vaping Products Act which became law on May 23, 2018, that "vaping is less harmful than smoking. Many of the toxic and cancer-causing chemicals in tobacco and the tobacco smoke form when tobacco is burned." They further state that "vaping products and e-cigarettes deliver nicotine in a less harmful way than smoking, and may reduce health risks for smokers".

The Canadian Heart and Stroke Foundation has stated, "While early studies show some potential benefits, the effectiveness of e-cigarettes with nicotine as a smoking cessation device is not fully conclusive," and expressed concerns about the lack of long-term studies with regard to health effects to the user as well as second-hand exposure. They also note public health officials' concerns about renormalizing smoking behavior undermining current tobacco control as well as being a gateway for nicotine addiction and tobacco use disorder.

=== China ===
About 1 adult in 4 smokes, but fewer than 1 in 100 vape. Tobacco-flavor is the only flavor allowed and ecigs cannot be sold online. In 2023 more middle school students smoked than vaped, and as of 2025 more university students - ecigs are not approved for stopping smoking. Over 1 in 5 deaths in China are due to smoking.

=== New Zealand ===
In 2020, the Ministry of Health of New Zealand issued a new position statement on nicotine vaping: "The Ministry considers vaping products could disrupt inequities and contribute to Smokefree 2025. The evidence on vaping products indicates they carry much less risk than smoking cigarettes but are not risk free. Evidence is growing that vaping can help people to quit smoking. There is no international evidence that vaping products are undermining the long-term decline in cigarette smoking among adults and youth, and may in fact be contributing to it." Position statement on vaping

The 2024 ASH Year 10 Snapshot Survey in New Zealand reported that regular vaping among 14- and 15-year-olds had fallen for a third consecutive year, to 14.1% in 2024 from a 2021 peak of 20.2%, while daily vaping fell to 8.7%.

=== Europe ===
However, in 2020 the World Health Organization Regional Office for Europe issued a report stating, "There is conclusive evidence that: Completely substituting electronic nicotine and non-nicotine delivery systems for combustible tobacco cigarettes reduces users' exposure to numerous toxicants and carcinogens present in combustible tobacco cigarettes."

==== France ====
In 2022, French health body le Haut Conseil de la santé publique (HCSP) said that health professionals should not recommend e-cigarettes for quitting, as there was not enough information on risks and benefits. Smokers trying to quit in France should not be offered vapes to help

==== United Kingdom ====
A 2022 Public Health England report reiterated the approximation that e-cigarettes are at least 95% less harmful than smoking.

=== United States ===
==== Government agencies ====
Following five confirmed deaths in the US, on September 6, 2019, the Centers for Disease Control and Prevention stated that while this investigation is ongoing, people should consider not using e-cigarette products. In 2016, the US Food and Drug Administration (FDA) stated that "Although ENDS [electronic nicotine delivery systems] may potentially provide cessation benefits to individual smokers, no ENDS have been approved as effective cessation aids." They also stated that "Although ENDS likely do not deliver the same level of toxicants as cigarettes, studies show that there are dangers associated with ENDS use". In July 2025, the FDA authorized Juul Labs’ tobacco- and menthol-flavored e-cigarette device and refill cartridges to remain on the U.S. market under the agency’s tobacco product authorization process, saying the evidence submitted showed potential benefits for adult smokers who switch completely to vaping, while reiterating that people who do not smoke should not use e-cigarettes.

==== Medical societies ====
On September 9, 2019, following an upsurge of reports of lung disease associated with vaping, the American Medical Association issued a statement saying "In light of increasing reports of e-cigarette-associated lung illnesses across the country, the AMA urges the public to avoid the use of e-cigarette products until health officials further investigate and understand the cause of these illnesses." The next day the American Lung Association issued a warning, saying "E-cigarettes are not safe and can cause irreversible lung damage and lung disease. No one should use e-cigarettes or any other tobacco product. This message is even more urgent today following the increasing reports of vaping-related illnesses and deaths nationwide." In 2019, the American Medical Association urged a complete ban on all types of vaping products that are not approved by the US FDA as quitting smoking aids.

== Risk context ==
When evaluating the health effects of some activity, a reasonable question is "what is the practical alternative?" If the alternatives are worse, then the activity must be measured against the alternatives. If the alternative is smoking, the answer might be different than if the alternative is simply to avoid nicotine. This is because the health impacts of smoking are strongly negative, while the impacts of avoiding nicotine entirely are positive.

=== Smoking ===
E-cigarette vapor does not contain tobacco and does not involve combustion, therefore users do not encounter several harmful constituents of tobacco smoke, such as ash, tar, and carbon monoxide.

The NHS stated that smoking creates many harmful toxins linked to cancer, lung disease, heart disease and stroke, while vaping gives users nicotine by heating an e-liquid and exposes users to fewer toxins at lower levels than smoking cigarettes.

Smokers can use e-cigarettes for various purposes. As an aid to quitting smoking, vaping is a temporary activity that reduces smoking and terminates once the smoker has completed the transition away from nicotine. To the extent that vaping aids the transition, its health effects are positive.

Alternatively, smokers can substitute vaping for smoking without intending to transition. In this context, vaping is still preferred. However, if vaping is used as a way to get nicotine in situations where smoking is not convenient, vaping may negatively affect health.

Other smoker-transition aids are available and may offer better safety and/or effectiveness profiles then vaping. Given equal effectiveness, relatively safety considerations would become paramount. However, a large-scale 2025 analysis indicated that other smoking cessation products are less effective at aiding transition than vaping.

The Centers for Disease Control and Prevention states that cigarette smoking is the leading preventable cause of disease, death, and disability in the United States and is responsible for more than 480,000 deaths each year.

The WHO reported in 2025 that tobacco kills more than 7 million smokers each year and an estimated 1.6 million non-smokers exposed to second-hand smoke.

== Individual effects ==
Health effects for non-smokers must be considered in absolute terms for long-term use as well as the risk of transition into traditional cigarettes, while for smokers the relative risks are paramount, and if used as a quitting aid, any short-term effects are most important.

=== Non-smokers ===
E-cigarettes create nicotine dependence in non-smokers. E-cigarettes may act as a gateway drug to smoking, particularly among youth. Pregnant or nursing women and the elderly are more sensitive to nicotine than other individuals.

=== Smokers ===
Used to transition to abstinence, e-cigarettes end the consumption of nicotine and the other harmful substances in tobacco smoke and later any harmful e-liquid ingredient. However, if abstinence is not achieved, e-cigarettes could mean increased nicotine dependence (by adding vaping to smoking) and ongoing harm from other e-liquid ingredients.

Health benefits associated with transitioning from smoking to vaping include decreased post-smoking weight gain and improved exercise tolerance.

Even a partially successful transition may allow smokers to reduce their cigarette consumption with related health benefits. A 2022 Cochrane review concluded that vaping increased quit rates compared to e-cigarettes without nicotine and compared to nicotine replacement therapy, although it did not compare vaping to other methods.

A 2025 RCP review reported that e-cigarettes sold in England (which allow nicotine strength of no more than 20 mg/ml) are unlikely to exceed 5% of the harm of cigarettes for non-pregnant adults. This claim is consistent with the 2018 view of the US National Academies of Sciences, Engineering, and Medicine.

=== General ===
Device defects can result in e.g., battery explosions and may cause burns or other injuries. Concentrated e-liquid exposure can come by leaks or spills. Nicotine poisoning can occur by ingestion, inhalation, or absorption via the skin or eyes. A 2018 review concluded that exposure to second-hand vapor can reduce lung function.

=== Neurological ===
Many effects on the nervous and the sensory systems are possibly related to nicotine overdose or withdrawal. E-cigarettes can cause seizures.

=== Injuries ===
E-cigarettes typically use lithium batteries, which may cause injury if defective or misused. A 2016 study reported that the explosion risk was low.

Another 2016 study assembled reports of 92 explosion, fire, or overheating events, with related injuries in 47 individuals. Prominent harms included 2 cervical vertebral fractures, 1 palate fracture, 3 instances of damaged teeth, 33 thermal burns, 4 chemical burns, and 5 lacerations. A 2017 study reported that most e-cigarette fires are triggered by batteries overheating and igniting. In 2018 PHE reported six UK case studies involving e-cigarettes with burns.

An e-cigarette explosion or fire can induce serious burns and harms. Explosions have resulted in lost teeth, neck fractures, and burns from combustion and/or battery acid. Reported burns covered from 1% to 8% of body area. They were most commonly reported in the lower extremity, hands, head and neck, and genitalia. Explosions in some cases produced 2nd and 3rd degree burns. A 2018 review concluded that some 50% needed surgical management.

A 2017 review observed that several reported injury cases occurred while the e-cigarette was carried in a pocket. The pocket may have sufficient moisture to start a chemical reaction within the lithium-ion battery, while the presence of metal objects can create a short-circuit, leading to an explosion. Burn risk extends to bystanders.

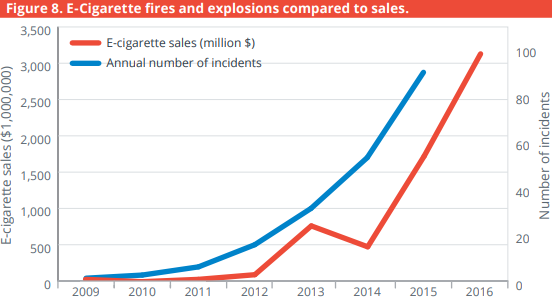
Graphic from a July 2016 United States Fire Administration (USFA) report entitled Electronic Cigarette Fires and Explosions in the United States 2009 – 2016. There has been an increase in the number of severe and moderate injuries resulting from e-cigarette explosions and fires since 2014. The USFA noted that this appears to correlate well with the e-cigarette sales trend.

The United States Fire Administration reported 195 occasions of e-cigarette fires and explosions between January 2009 and December 2016. These incidents resulted in 133 acute injuries, of which 38 (29%) were severe. A 2017 review concluded that 80% of e-cigarette explosions occurred during battery charging, many by 3rd-party power adaptors that used inappropriately high charge rates that led to thermal runaway. Some vendors assembled e-cigarettes from incompatible parts.

E-cigarette device explodes in man's pocket while on bus in California.

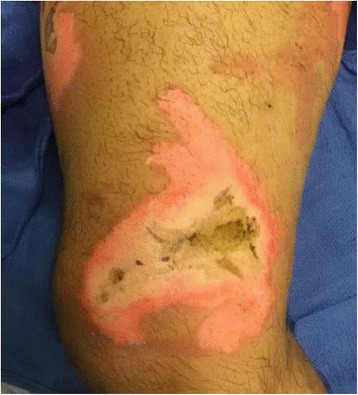
A 35-year-old otherwise healthy male sustained a 2% total body surface area burn to his right lateral thigh when an e-cigarette device in the right back pocket of his pants spontaneously combusted, burning a hole through his pants.

=== Poisoning ===
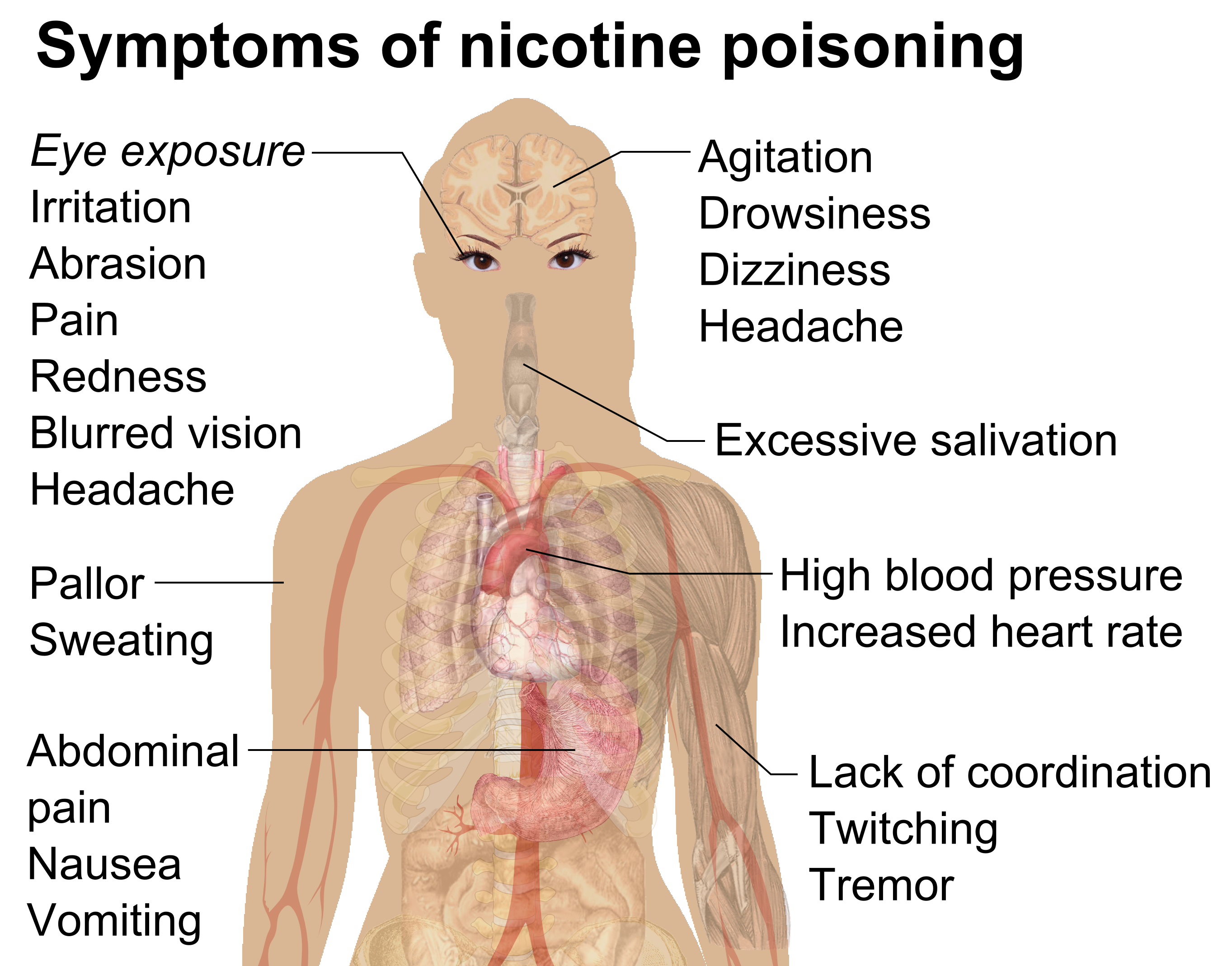
Symptoms of nicotine poisoning related to e-cigarette calls to US poison control centers

E-cigaratte nicotine poisoning occurs via ingestion, inhalation, or absorption via the skin or eyes.

Such poisoning is apparently rare, suggested by the fact that reviews highlight individual cases. In 2014, an infant died from choking on an e-cigarette component. As of 2016 four adults were reported to have died in the US and Europe after intentionally ingesting e-liquid. Two children, one in the US in 2014 and another in Israel in 2013, died after ingesting liquid nicotine. A two-year-old girl in the UK in 2014 was hospitalized after licking an e-cigarette liquid refill.

A 2022 concluded that toxicity can come from aerosols containing toxic chemicals or excessive concentrations of nicotine as an e-liquid.

A 2016 study reported minor, moderate, and serious adverse effects. Minor effects correlated with e-liquid poisoning were tachycardia, tremor, chest pain and hypertension. More serious effects were bradycardia, hypotension, nausea, respiratory paralysis, atrial fibrillation and dyspnea. Initial symptoms included rapid heart rate, sweating, feeling sick, and vomiting. Delayed symptoms included low blood pressure, seizures, and hypoventilation. Rare serious effects included coma, seizure, trouble breathing, and heart attack. After examining poison control centers' reports between 2010 and early 2019, FDA reported that, between the poison control centers and FDA, 35 cases of seizures mentioned use of e-cigarettes.

From 2011 to 2019, cases of accidental poisoning from nicotine e-liquids grew rapidly in the US. From 1 September 2010, to 31 December 2014, 58% of e-cigarette calls to US poison control centers were related to children under 6. In 2014 Centers for Disease Control and Prevention (CDC) reported that 51.1% of the calls to US poison centers due to e-cigarettes were related to children under age 5, and while 42% of calls were related to people age 20 and older. Severe outcomes were more than 2.5 times more frequent in children exposed to e-cigarettes and nicotine e-liquid than with traditional cigarettes.

US poison control centers reported that 92.5% of children who came in contact with nicotine e-liquid swallowed it during the period from January 2012 to April 2017.

Most frequent adverse effects from ingestion
Effect	Frequency (%)
vomiting	40.4
eye irritation or pain	20.3
nausea	16.8
red eye or conjunctivitis	10.5
dizziness	7.5
tachycardia	7.1
drowsiness	7.1
agitation	6.3
headache	4.8
cough	4.5

In 2016 American Association of Poison Control Centers (AAPCC) reported 2,907 exposures regarding e-cigarettes and liquid nicotine. The yearly nicotine exposure rate in the US involving children went up by 1,398% from 2012 to 2015, later dropping by 20% from 2015 to 2016. In 2017 the National Poison Data System stated that exposures to e-cigarettes and liquid nicotine among young children was rising significantly.

=== Respiratory ===
E-cigarettes are associated with asthma and other respiratory diseases. A 2015 review concluded that e-cigarettes may induce acute lung disease.

A 2018 study reported correlations between vaping and pleural effusions. A 2015 study reported that e-cigarette vapors can induce oxidative stress in lung endothelial cells. A 2016 review concluded that e-cigarette vapor that triggered constant lung inflammation could result in lung pathogenesis and induce diseases such as chronic obstructive pulmonary disease and fibrosis. A 2018 review concluded that e-cigarette vapors can result in acute endothelial cell injury, but the long-term effects were uncertain. A 2017 review concluded "Exposure to nicotine that was specifically generated by the use of e-cigarettes, was shown to promote oxidative stress and impairment of autophagy, which in turn serves as a potential mechanism leading to development of chronic obstructive pulmonary disease." A 2014 case report observed the correlation between sub-acute bronchiolitis and vaping. After quitting vaping the symptoms improved. Vaping causes bronchospasm. Adolescents who vaped had a higher frequency of chronic bronchitis symptoms.

A 2018 study reported that adolescent vapers with asthma or other respiratory ailments could have greater odds of increasing respiratory symptoms and aggravations. In 2018 PHE reported "There have been some studies with adolescents suggesting respiratory symptoms among EC experimenters. However, small scale or uncontrolled switching studies from smoking to vaping have demonstrated some respiratory improvements." A 2017 review concluded "among a population of 11th-grade and 12th-grade students in California, vaping was associated with twice the risk of respiratory symptoms, and the risk increased with more frequent e-cigarette use."

E-cigarette particles are small enough to enter the alveoli and to go deep in the lungs and enter into systemic circulation. A 2017 study reported that vapor containing particulate matter with a diameter of 2.5 μm enters the circulation via the cardiopulmonary system, with a large deposit in the respiratory tract. A 2014 review concluded that metal nanoparticles can deposit in the alveolar sacs with possible pulmonary toxicity. A 2015 study reported that particle sizes differ across devices with impacts on respiratory tract depositions, and without regard to e-liquid.

A 2018 review concluded that exposure to vapor has adverse effects on lungs and pulmonary function. Repeated acrolein exposure causes chronic pulmonary inflammation, reduction of host defense, neutrophil inflammation, mucus hypersecretion, and protease-mediated lung tissue damage, which are linked to the development of chronic obstructive pulmonary disease (COPD). Although e-cigarette aerosol also exposes users to highly oxidizing free radicals, their chemical characteristics is unclear.

It further reported that vapers experienced decreased expression of immune-related genes in their nasal cavities, more so than smokers. By contrast, vaping upregulates expression of platelet-activating factor receptor (PAFR) in nasal epithelial cells; PAFR is an important molecule involved in the ability of S. pneumoniae, (leading cause of bacterial pneumonia), to attach to cells.

A 2020 study reported that vaping led to lung injuries that include hypersensitivity pneumonitis (HP), diffuse alveolar hemorrhage (DAH), acute eosinophilic pneumonia (AEP), diffuse alveolar damage, organizing pneumonia (OP), lipoid pneumonia, and giant cell interstitial pneumonia (GIP). A 2016 study reported that adverse effects may include airway resistance, irritation of the airways, eyes redness, dry throat, and increase in allergic airway inflammation with elevated infiltration of inflammatory cells including eosinophils into airways. A 2015 study reported that the most reported short-term adverse effects were mouth and throat irritation, dry cough, and nausea. Another 2016 study reported nose bleeds, change in bronchial gene expression, release of cytokines and proinflammatory mediators.

==== Youth ====
A 2016 review concluded that nicotine exposure harms youths' growing brains. Vaping is associated with a positive association of vaping and chronic bronchitis among US high school juniors and seniors; which persisted among former users. Vaping was associated with an increased diagnosis of asthma and asthma-related school absences among Korean never-smoker high school students. A 2018 review concluded that child vapers had a higher likelihood of more and more significant adverse effects than child smokers. Significant harmful effects included cyanosis, nausea, and coma.

A 2020/21 survey of 39,214 young people (aged 16 to 19) from the US, Canada, and England found that those who vaped were more likely to have breathing issues (breathlessness, wheezing, chest pain, phlegm, and cough) than those who did not. Also, the more young people vaped, the higher their chance of breathing issues.

==== 2019–2020 vaping lung injury outbreak ====
An outbreak of e-cigarette, or vaping, product use-associated lung injury began in 2019 among users of illegal, unregulated cannabis vaping products, almost exclusively in the United States. The first cases were identified in Illinois and Wisconsin in April 2019; as of 18 February 2020, a total of 2,807 hospitalized cases, including 68 deaths, had been confirmed. According to the U.S. Centers for Disease Control (CDC), "Vitamin E acetate is strongly linked to the outbreak...Evidence is not sufficient to rule out the contribution of other chemicals of concern, including chemicals in either THC or non-THC products".

Cases peaked in September 2019, and declined thereafter. The decline led CDC to stop reporting cases in February 2020, but as of December 2020, continued to monitor cases arriving in emergency departments. Some states continued to record new cases. As of January 2022, California had reported at least 40 cases diagnosed after February 2020. As of March 2022, cases continued to be diagnosed. At least 73 cases were diagnosed in Utah after February 2020.

CDC investigators identified direct exposure to chemicals present in illegal cannabis vaping products as the likely culprit, but did not rule out chemicals in nicotine vapes as possible causes. CDC: "No specific e-cigarette device or substance has been linked to all cases, and e-cigarettes include a variety of chemical and additives". 84% of patients studied by the CDC reported THC use. The majority of those affected were adults aged 18–34, the biggest cannabis vapers in the US.

=== Cardiovascular ===
Reported risks include exposure to toxic chemicals, increased likelihood of respiratory and cardiovascular diseases, reduced lung function, reduced cardiac muscle function, and increased inflammation. A 2018 review concluded that the specific role of nicotine in cardiovascular disease had not been established.

A 2023 review concluded that vaping causes significant, potentially harmful effects on many cardiovascular parameters. A 2024 review attributed cardiovascular effects to oxidative stress, inflammation, endothelial dysfunction, atherosclerosis, hemodynamic effects, and platelet function. A 2019 review reported limited evidence of vaping's adverse impacts on endothelial function and arterial hardening. A 2017 review concluded that vaping could exacerbate adverse cardiovascular effects among those who already have cardiovascular disease. Studies of aldehydes, particulates, and flavorings reported mixed impacts on cardiovascular health. A 2017 review stated that low amounts of aldehydes are a health concern, particularly among individuals with cardiovascular disease. Vaping is associated with heart failure. A 2017 review concluded that vapor particles can enter circulation via the airways.

Many vapor components impact atherosclerosis.

A 2016 review concluded that vaping generates sympathomimetic effects. A 2016 review concluded that there could be a risk for conditions such as tachycardia-induced cardiomyopathy. A 20154 clinician's review reported that short-term effects included increases in blood pressure and heart rate. A 2017 review concluded that these increases among smokers who vaped was lower than with smoking. A 2016 study reported vaping increased aortic stiffness in people with no cardiovascular risk factors, and that the increase was lower than smoking. A 2017 review concluded that habitual vaping was associated with oxidative stress and a shift towards cardiac sympathetic activity, which are both associated with a risk of developing cardiovascular disease. A 2017 review highlighted an association between 2.5 μm particulate exposure and cardiovascular disease.

A 2018 review noted that nicotine is not the only biologically active component in e-cigarette aerosol. Vapor particles are of broadly similar size to those in traditional cigarettes. These particles can be biologically active, trigger inflammatory processes, and are directly implicated in causing cardiovascular disease and acute cardiovascular events. Their dose-response effect is nonlinear, with substantial increases in cardiovascular risk with even low exposure levels. Vapor induces platelet activation, aggregation, and adhesion, which are associated with increased cardiovascular risk. These changes produce rapid deterioration of vascular function. E-cigarette and traditional cigarette smoking in individuals with no known cardiovascular disease exhibit similar inhibition of artery dilation in response to the need for more blood flow. This change reflects damage to vascular endothelium and increases the risk of long-term heart disease and an acute event such as a myocardial infarction (heart attack). Vaping is accompanied by a shift in balance of the autonomic (reflex) nervous system toward sympathetic predominance, which is also associated with increased cardiac risk. Daily vaping is correlated with an increased risk of myocardial infarction in health surveys.

==== Gastrointestinal (GI) system ====
A mucosal intestinal barrier separates the external and internal environments within the body. This barrier allows water, ions, solutes, and nutrients to cross the barrier while excluding bacteria and toxins. Tight junctions (TJ) help with the construction and permeability of the barrier in the gut by firmly securing joints. Chronic, repetitive exposure to e-cigarettes damages this barrier by breaking the TJs, which causes gut inflammation, assage of bacteria. altering gene expression. A 2021 study reported that chronic use of nicotine-free e-cigarettes still caused inflammation and decreased TJ markers.

A 2022 study reported that common GI health effects include nausea, vomiting, gastrointestinal discomfort, xerostomia, oral mucositis, gum bleeding, gingivitis, gastric burning, altered bowel habits, and acid reflux. Chronic exposure also drives inflammation in the colon.

==== Nervous system ====
A 2024 review concluded that nicotine exposure has detrimental effects on the nervous system, especially during adolescence. Exposure during developmental stages changes brain structure and function. Vaping is linked to impairment of cognitive processes, increased mood disorders and addiction, damage to functions such as memory, reasoning, impulse control, and attention. A 2020 study reported lower gene expression, reducing occludin, which compromises the stability and strength of the blood-brain-barrier, resulting in neurovascular dysfunction, neuroinflammation, and cognitive defects.

==== Oral cavity ====
A 2018 review reported little evidence indicating that vaping is less damaging than smoking for periodontal disease and can lead to increased risk of periodontal disease. A 2017 review concluded that nicotine and flavorings may damage periodontal ligaments, stem cells, and gingival fibroblasts in cultures from aldehydes and/or carbonyls from vapor. A 2016 clinicians guide state that e-cigarettes could harm the periodontium because of the effects of nicotine on gum tissues and the immune system. A 2021 study reported that vaping resulted in nicotine stomatitis, hairy tongue, angular cheilitis, and oral mucosal lesions E-cigarettes seems to not be implicated in oral cancer.

== Public health effects ==
Various studies rate the public health impacts of vaping as far less negative than those of smoking.

=== Second-hand vapor ===
E-cigarette emissions are not comparable to cigarette smoke as their chemical composition is completely different. Vapor content varies depending on the e-liquid, the device, and usage. Exhaled vapor consists of mixtures of nicotine, ultrafine particles, primarily propylene glycol, glycerin, flavorings, and aroma transporters, aldehydes, and volatile organic chemicals (VOC) that form a visible fog. The vapor has a half-life of about 10 seconds; smoke lasts 100 times longer. E-cigarettes produce similar levels of particulates to tobacco cigarettes.

Vapor particles are larger than smoke particles, with a mean droplet size of 600 nm (inhaled) and 300 nm (exhaled) along with particles with a diameter of around 2.5 μm. Exhaled vapor concentration is 5 times lower than cigarette smoke. Particle density measured 6 to 880 times lower.

One 2015 study reported that exhaled vapor might have significant adverse effects. Another reported that e-cigarettes that do not contain nicotine may also generate hazardous vapors and could present a second-hand risk. A third reported that vapor may include propylene glycol aerosols at levels that can cause eye and respiratory irritation and exceed California Environmental Protection Agency standards. A 2017 study reported that people living with e‐cigarette users had increased salivary nicotine concentrations. Another reported that some non-users reported adverse effects from second-hand vapor.

A 2016 survey reported that nearly half of middle and high school students had been exposed.

A 2017 review concluded that the few studies that examined the effect of indoor air quality on human test subjects in natural settings produced inconsistent results. As of 2018 only limited information of the effects of exhaled vapor on children was available.

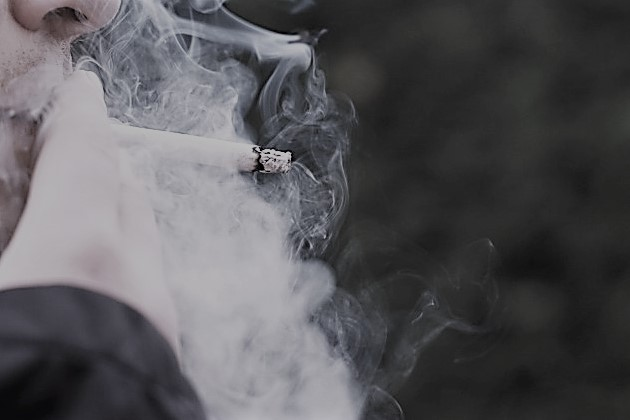
Aerosol (vapor) exhaled by a vaper may expose non-users to second-hand vapor.

A 2018 study reported PM_{2.5} levels in a large hotel event room (4,023m^{3}) increased from 2–3 μg/m^{3} to as high as 819 μg/m^{3} (interquartile range: 761–975 μg/m^{3}) when 59–86 people were vaping. This level exceeded the US Environmental Protection Agency annual time-weighted standard for PM_{2.5} of 12 μg/m^{3}.

A 2018 review concluded that bystanders absorb nicotine when people around them use e-cigarettes at levels comparable with exposure to second-hand smoke. It included a study comparing non-smokers living with vapers, with smokers, and non-users (controls). That study found cotinine (a nicotine metabolite) levels in urine were significantly elevated in the first two groups vs the controls, but were not significantly different, despite the fact that air pollution levels in the smokers' homes was much higher than in the vapers' homes (geometric mean air nicotine concentrations of 0.13 μg/m^{3} in vapers' homes, 0.74 μg/m^{3} in smokers' homes, and 0.02 μg/m^{3} in the control homes). A 2014 practice guideline by NPS MedicineWise stated that serum cotinine levels were similar in bystanders exposed to either vapour or smoke.

In 2014, several groups came out against e-cigarettes. The International Union Against Tuberculosis and Lung Disease stated, "Adverse health effects for exposed third parties (second-hand exposure) cannot be excluded because the use of e-cigarettes leads to emission of fine and ultrafine inhalable liquid particles, nicotine and cancer-causing substances into indoor air." The American Industrial Hygiene Association concluded that "e-cigarettes are not emission-free and that their pollutants could be of health concern for users and those who are exposed secondhand....[T]heir use in the indoor environment should be restricted, consistent with current smoking bans, until and unless research documents that they will not significantly increase the risk of adverse health effects to room occupants." Similarly, in 2016 the American Society of Heating, Refrigeration and Air-Conditioning Engineers (ASHRAE) updated its standard for "Ventilation for Acceptable Indoor Air Quality" to incorporate emissions from e-cigarettes into the definition of "environmental tobacco smoke," which is incompatible with acceptable indoor air quality. A 2017 French "experts statement" recommended banning vaping indoors in public and working areas.

A 2014 WHO report stated passive exposure was a concern, indicating that current evidence is insufficient to determine whether the levels of exhaled vapor are safe to involuntarily exposed bystanders. The report stated that "it is unknown if the increased exposure to toxicants and particles in exhaled aerosol will lead to an increased risk of disease and death among bystanders." A 2016 WHO report stated, "While some argue that exposure to SHA [second-hand aerosol] is unlikely to cause significant health risks, they concede that SHA can be deleterious to bystanders with some respiratory pre-conditions. It is nevertheless reasonable to assume that the increased concentration of toxicants from SHA over background [air] levels poses an increased risk for the health of all bystanders."

Several medical organizations advocate that vaping be banned in public places and workplaces. A 2014 review concluded it is safe to infer that their effects on bystanders are minimal in comparison to traditional cigarettes. E-cigarette vapor has notably fewer toxicants than cigarette smoke.

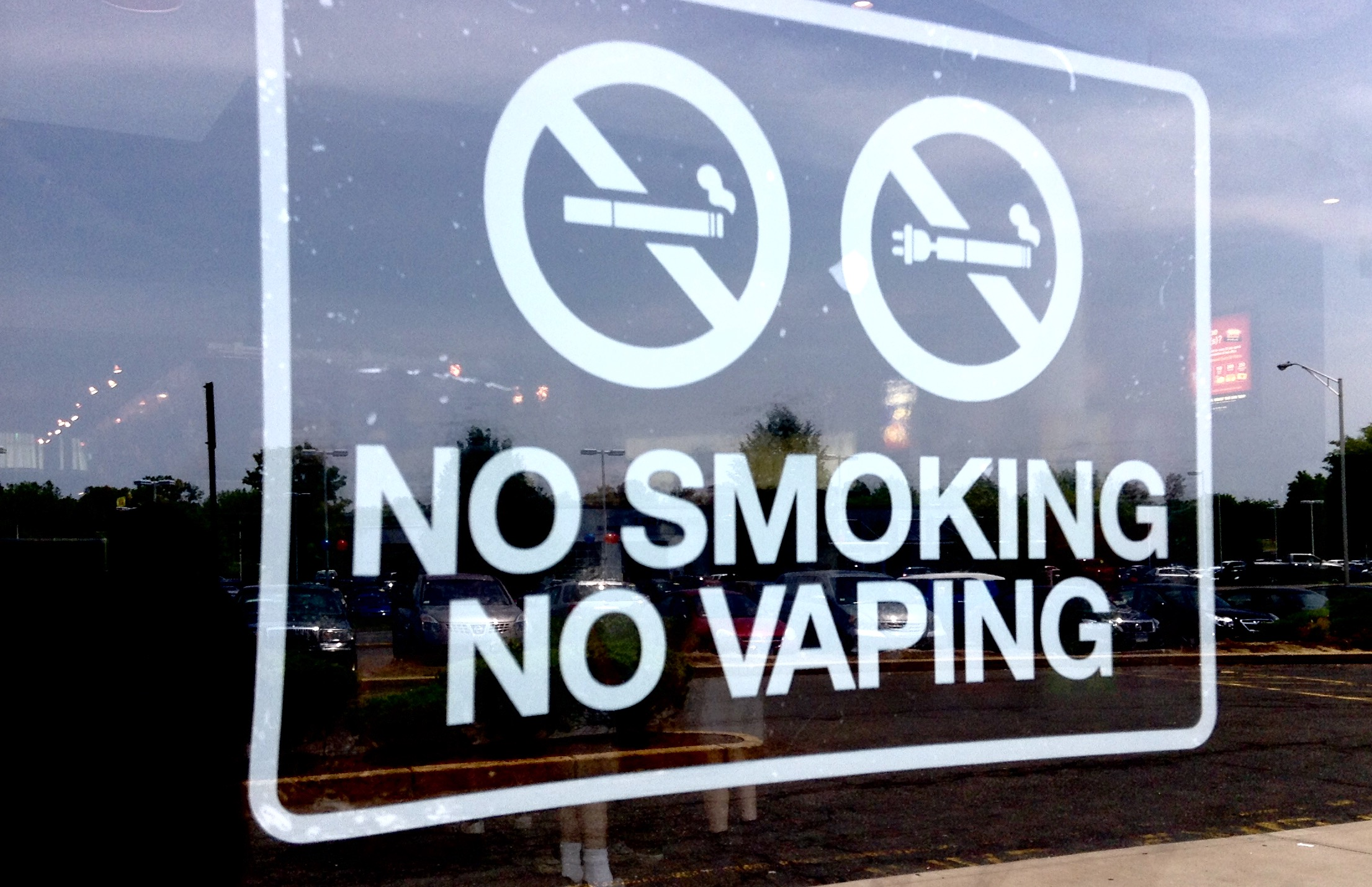
A no smoking or vaping sign from the US

A 2015 California Department of Public Health report stated that vapour "has been reported to contain at least ten chemicals that are on California's Proposition 65 list of chemicals known to cause cancer, birth defects, or other reproductive harm."

A 2017 study reported that some chemicals could violate workplace safety standards. A review of convention studies concluded that second-hand vapor may be significant, particularly for workers who repeatedly encounter it. Exposure studies suggest that indoor vaping is higher than the smoke-free level put forth by the US Surgeon General and the WHO Framework Convention on Tobacco Control.

A 2014 review suggested that vapor contaminant levels do not exceed workplace safety standards, and are mostly below 1% of permissible levels. However, workplace standards do not consider more vulnerable groups such as those in poor health, children, and infants. 2 015 PHE report concluded that e-cigarettes "release negligible levels of nicotine into ambient air with no identified health risks to bystanders".

=== Direct exposure ===
Direct exposure happens via e-liquid inhalation, ingestion, skin contact, or vapor residue accumulation on surfaces. Direct exposure is almost always inadvertent, and results from improper product use. Exposure can involve much higher concentrations than exhaled vapor.

Exposure may involve a leaking or spilled e-liquid cartridge or bottle.

E-liquid quickly absorbs into the skin and local irritation can follow. Less than 1 tablespoon can cause adverse effects such as seizures, anoxic brain trauma, vomiting, lactic acidosis, cardiac arrest, seizures, or coma. A potentially fatal dose for a child is 0.1–0.2 mg/kg of body weight, or 6 mg. A fatal dose for an adult is 0.5–1 mg/kg or about 30–60 mg. However the widely used human LD_{50} estimate of around 0.8 mg/kg was questioned in a 2013 review, in light of documented cases of humans surviving much higher doses; the lower fatal limit was 500–1000 mg of ingested nicotine, which is equivalent to 6.5–13 mg/kg orally.

==== Vapor build-up ====
E‐cigarettes can be unsafe to non-users via third-hand exposure, including children, pregnant women, nursing mothers, casino employees, housekeeping employees, and vulnerable groups.

In one scenario, indoor surfaces can accumulate nicotine-laden vapor residue. However, the extent of such contamination has not been established. A 2015 PHE report stated that an infant would have to lick 30 square meters to be exposed to 1 mg of nicotine. As with any potential hazard, childhood exploratory behavior creates risks not faced by others.

==== Risks to children ====
Children are more likely to mistake a colorful e-liquid container for a juice container. The US mandates child-proof packaging.

==== Self-harm ====
As of 2019 a few incidents of intentional self-harm by ingesting or injecting e-liquids had been reported. Death from intentional nicotine poisoning is almost unknown.

=== Pets ===
In 2017, FDA stated that e-cigarette aerosols can cause problems for both users and their pets. Some studies reported that aerosols may provide exposure to higher-than-normal amounts of nicotine and other toxic chemicals, such as formaldehyde. E-cigarettes typically use capsules to contain nicotine. Pets may find and bite them or expose themselves to the liquid refilling solution. In a 15 March 2016, letter to the editor of the Journal of the American Veterinary Medical Association, the Texas Poison Center Network reported 11 cases of dog exposures to e-cigarettes or refills.

== Toxicology ==
The long-term health impacts of vaping are unknown, particularly given the variety of EC devices, e‑liquids, and consumption patterns. This specifically applies to nicotine and propylene glycol. Limited peer-reviewed data restricts the scope of toxicological evaluation; their cytotoxicity is unknown. A 2014 review concluded that few e-cigarettes had undergone a thorough toxicology evaluation and testing.

=== Toxicant comparisons ===
E-cigarettes supply nicotine and other toxins at rates far below traditional cigarettes and other nicotine delivery systems:

E-cigarette toxicants compared with nicotine inhaler and cigarette smoke
Toxicant	Nicotine inhaler mist (15 puffs∗)	E-cigarettes (15 puffs∗)	1 cigarette
Formaldehyde (μg)	0.2	0.2-5.61	1.6-52
Acetaldehyde (μg)	0.11	0.11-1.36	52-140
Acrolein (μg)	ND	0.07-4.19	2.4-62
o-Methylbenzaldehyde (μg)	0.07	0.13-0.71	—
Toluene (μg)	ND	ND-0.63	8.3-70
p- and m-Xylene (μg)	ND	ND-0.2	—
NNN (ng)	ND	ND-0.00043	0.0005-0.19
Cadmium (ng)	0.003	ND-0.022	—
Nickel (ng)	0.019	0.011-0.029	—
Lead (ng)	0.004	0.003-0.057	—

=== DNA damage ===
Nicotine has been reported to damage DNA, assessed by the Escherichia colipol A+/pol− test. A 2015 review concluded that nicotine decreases Chk2, a tumor suppressor, which is otherwise activated by DNA damage. The Chk2 decrease suggests nicotine may be able to override DNA damage checkpoint activation, disrupt genetic surveillance, and increase the risk of oncogenesis. One 2018 study reported strong evidence that some vapor substances such as formaldehyde and acrolein can induce DNA damage and mutagenesis.

Nicotine can induce chromosomal aberration, chromatid exchange, single-strand DNA strand breaks, and micronuclei in vitro. Oxidative stress is likely involved, since the effects are reduced when antioxidants are present. The effects decrease after co-incubation with a NAR antagonist, indicating a receptor-dependent pathway for oxidative stress induction.

Vapor triggered DNA strand breaks and lowered cell survival in vitro, regardless of nicotine content. A 2013 study reported that some vapor samples had cytotoxic effects on cardiac muscle cells, (albeit less than those of cigarette smoke). A 2016 review concluded that vapor had adverse effects on primary airway epithelial cells and tumor cell lines, and other epithelial cell lines, that ranged from reducing viability, increase in production of inflammatory mediators and oxidative stress, reduced antimicrobial defences and increased pro-carcinogenic events.

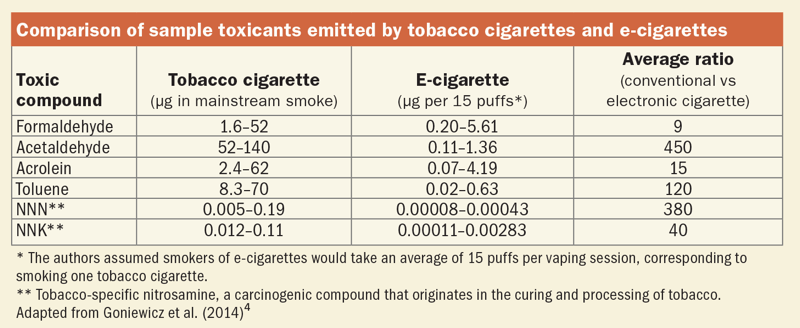
Chart showing various toxicants as measured in cigarette smoke and e-cigarette aerosol

=== Propylene glycol and glycerin ===
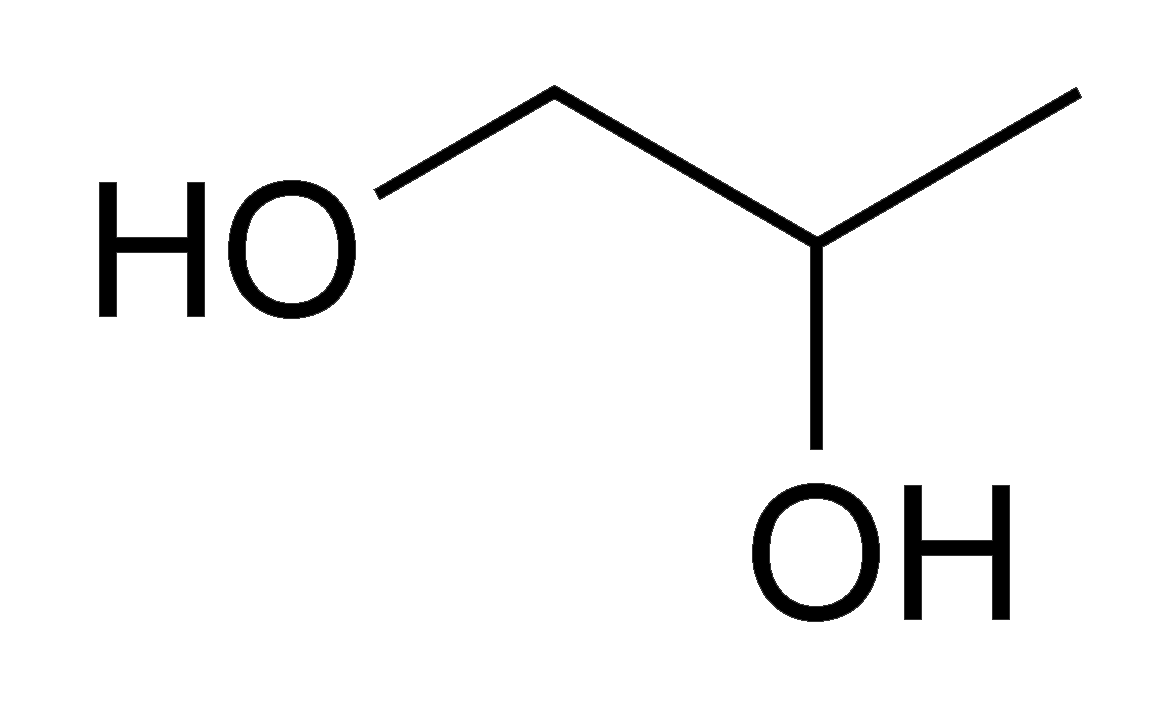
The propylene glycol molecule

The primary base ingredients of e-liquids are propylene glycol and glycerin. About 20% to 27% of propylene glycol and glycerin-based liquid particles are inhaled. A 2016 study reported that 6% of nicotine, 8% of propylene glycol, and 16% of glycerin was exhaled. As of 2014 the long-term effects of inhaled propylene glycol and glycerin were unknown. Exposure to propylene glycol may cause eye and respiratory tract irritation. Heated and aerosolized propylene glycol can turn into propylene oxide, which the International Agency for Research on Cancer (IARC) labels a possible human carcinogen. A 2014 review concluded that the risk from propylene glycol and glycerin inhalation is probably low, although they have not been demonstrated to be safe. A 2013 German Cancer Center report stated that long-term indoor inhalation of propylene glycol could increase childhood asthma risks. As of 2014, some companies replaced propylene glycol with water and glycerin. A 2019 study reported that inhaled glycerin could cause lipoid pneumonia. A 2017 review concluded that propylene glycol and glycerin increased the amount of hydrogen peroxide.

==== Acrolein ====
Some e-liquids produced acrolein in the aerosol (a probable carcinogen), possibly from heated glycerin. A 2014 review concluded that acrolein levels were reduced by 60% in dual users and 80% for those that completely switched to e-cigarettes when compared to traditional cigarettes. Another 2014 review concluded that acrolein may induce irritation to the upper respiratory tract, while a 2014 study reported harm to the lining of the lungs. A 2017 review concluded that acrolein induces oxidative stress and inflammation, disrupting lung endothelial cell barrier function and may lead to chronic obstructive pulmonary disease. Another 2017 review stated, "based on the average of 120 puffs/day reported in the literature, our calculated levels of acrolein emitted by e‐cigarette users per day were reported to vary between 0.00792 and 8.94 ppm/day."

==== Oxidants/reactive oxygen species ====
A 2015 study reported that vapor created oxidants and reactive oxygen species (OX/ROS). OX/ROS could react with other vaporized substances because they are highly reactive. E-cigarettes were reported to contain OX/ROS at about 100 times less than in cigarette smoke. Recent in vitro research has demonstrated that nicotine-free e-cigarette vapor induces oxidative stress in human endothelial cells via activation of ARF6 and its guanine nucleotide exchange factor ARNO. This oxidative stress promotes abnormal angiogenic signalling and endothelial dysfunction, suggesting that vaping without nicotine may still contribute to vascular injury through reactive oxygen species pathways. Similar findings have been reported with nicotine-containing e-cigarette condensate, indicating that both nicotine-free and nicotine-containing vaping fluids can disrupt pulmonary endothelial function via ARF6-mediated mechanisms.

=== Flavorings ===
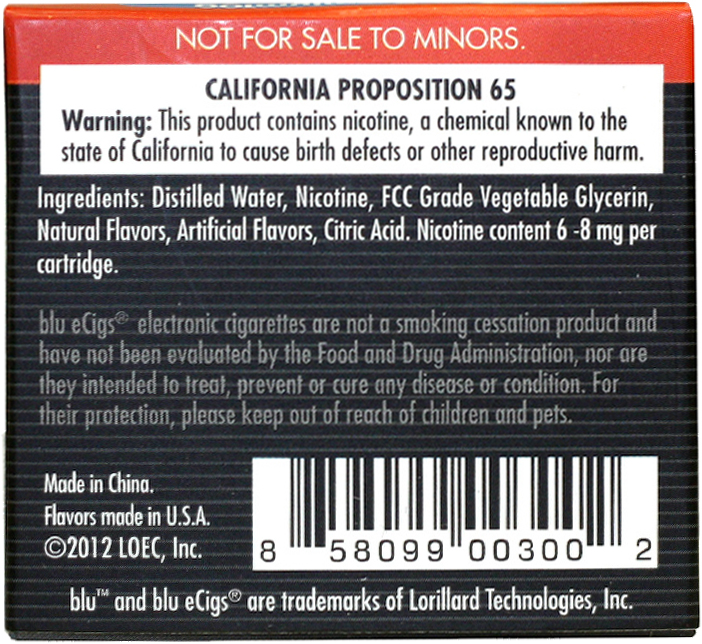
The ingredients in an e-cigarette cartridge: Distilled water, Nicotine, FCC Grade Vegetable Glycerin, Natural Flavors, Artificial Flavors, Citric Acid. Nicotine content 6-8 mg per cartridge.

Flavored e-liquids contain additional substances in part to disguise nicotine's bitter taste. Their health effects are not entirely known, given limited toxicological data. A 2017 study reported that flavorings can be a significant part of toxicants. Each flavoring has a different chemical composition. A 2015 study reported varied cytotoxicity of e-liquids, ranging from little to significant cytotoxicity. The liquids contain aromatic substances such as tobacco, fruit, vanilla, caramel, and coffee. Typically, these additives are imprecisely described, using terms such as "vegetable flavoring". Although they are approved for human consumption no studies assess the short-term or long-term effects of inhaling them. As of 2016 their safety had not been assessed by the US Flavor and Extract Manufacturers Association (FEMA). As of 2018 the majority of flavorings in e-liquids had not been investigated for inhalation toxicity. A 2017 review stated that FEMA had identified 1037 flavoring agents as potential respiratory hazards due to volatility and respiratory irritant properties. Common flavoring agents on that list include diacetyl, acetoin, 2,3-pentanedione (buttery), camphor and cyclohexanone (minty), benzaldehyde (cherry or almond), cinnamaldehyde (cinnamon), cresol (leathery) or medicinal (chocolate), and isoamyl acetate (banana). As of 2017 the four most commonly reported flavoring additives were vanillin, ethyl maltol, ethyl vanillin, and menthol. A 2017 review stated, "the implication by manufacturers that flavoring ingredients used in e-cigarettes and related devices (e.g. hookahs) are safe for inhalation because they have FEMA GRAS™ status for use in food has been stated to be 'false and misleading' by FEMA."

Many flavorings are irritants. The limited available data suggest that the majority of flavorings could lead to significant health risks from long-term use, particularly those that are sweet. Some e-liquids contain large amounts of flavorings. A 2016 study of 30 e-cigarette products in the US market reported that 13 were more than 1% flavoring chemicals by weight, some of which were of potential toxicological concern (e.g., cause respiratory irritation). Some flavorings are toxic and some resemble known carcinogens. A 2016 study of five flavorings across six types of e-cigarettes reported that flavorings significantly affected the in vitro toxicity profile. Some artificial flavorings are known cytotoxins. Unflavored vapor is less cytotoxic than flavored vapor. The evidence is unclear that particular flavorings carry health risks, though some may increase such risks.

Cinnamaldehyde has been described as highly cytotoxic. Cinnamaldehyde has been detected in flavorings such as cinnamon, tobacco, sweet (e.g. caramel), and fruit. Coffee and cinnamon flavorings are reported to be the most toxic. A 2017 review concluded that they were carcinogenic or toxic, and could contribute to cardiopulmonary diseases and neurodegenerative disorders. Only sparse evidence directly associates cinnamon inhalations with asthma. Some e-liquids containing cinnamaldehyde stimulate TRPA1, which might induce effects on the lung. In human lung fibroblasts, cinnamon roll flavoring resulted in a noticeable rise in the amount of inflammatory cytokine IL-8.

A 2019 case report described an 18-year-old patient using a Juul device with mint-flavored pods in the days before episodes of pneumothorax. A 2019 study that sampled e-cigarette delivery systems reported that Juul pods were the only product to demonstrate in vitro cytotoxicity from both nicotine and flavoring chemical content, in particular ethyl maltol. As of 2017 limited data described the effects of menthol inhalation. Some flavorings may increase lung toxicity or lung inflammation in part by producing free radicals and inflammation.

E-liquids contain possibly toxic aldehydes and reactive oxygen species (ROS). Many flavorings are known aldehydes, such as anisaldehyde, cinnamaldehyde, and isovaleraldehyde. Saccharides in sweet e-liquid flavorings generate furans and aldehydes when vaporized. The consequences of aldehyde-containing flavorings on pulmonary surfaces are unknown. Methanol increased the amount of hydrogen peroxide. A 2017 study reported a variety of flavoring-initiated inflammatory cytokines in lung cell cultures, of which acetoin and maltol were among the strongest. It is possible that flavorings may worsen harmful effects such as diminished cell viability, escalated rates of apoptosis, escalated DNA strand breaks, alterations in cell morphology and intensified inflammatory mediator production.

Although there were concerns in the 2010s, vaping does not cause popcorn lung. Cherry flavorings contain a benzaldehyde, a main ingredient for many fruit flavorings. Benzaldehyde can irritate the eyes and respiratory mucous membranes.

=== Formaldehyde ===
IARC categorized formaldehyde as a human carcinogen, and acetaldehyde is categorized as a potential human carcinogen. Formaldehyde induced DNA damage and inhibited DNA repair. Acetaldehyde generated DNA crosslinking, which impedes metabolic functions, including DNA replication, repair, recombination, transcription and chromatin remodeling. Aldehydes may cause harm. A 2016 study reported that e-liquids without flavoring generated no aldehydes, which indicated that flavorings were causing the creation of aldehydes, according to a 2018 PHE report.

Chemicals can be inadvertently produced, especially carbonyls such as formaldehyde, acetaldehyde, acrolein, and glyoxal when the nichrome wire (heating element) reaches a high enough temperature. Potentially hazardous carbonyls have been identified in aerosols at temperatures above 200 °C.

A 2017 study reported that battery output voltage positively influenced carbonyl vapor levels. A 2015 study reported that e-cigarettes using higher voltages (5.0 V) can emit carcinogens including formaldehyde at levels comparable to cigarette smoke, while lower voltages (3.0 V) produce levels of formaldehyde and acetaldehyde roughly 13 and 807-fold less than in cigarette smoke. Elevated aldehyde formation has an unpleasant taste, leading users to avoid it. The average amount of formaldehyde in vapor from high-voltage devices is higher than the average from cigarettes.

The amount of formaldehyde expected to be inhaled by the user is disputed. In 2015 PHE reported that normal vaping generates low levels of aldehydes. Normal usage also generates low levels of formaldehyde. However, users detect and avoid the "dry puff", leading them to conclude, "There is no indication that EC users are exposed to dangerous levels of aldehydes." In 2018 PHE reported that at normal temperatures, aldehyde levels were negligible compared with smoke.

=== Nicotine ===
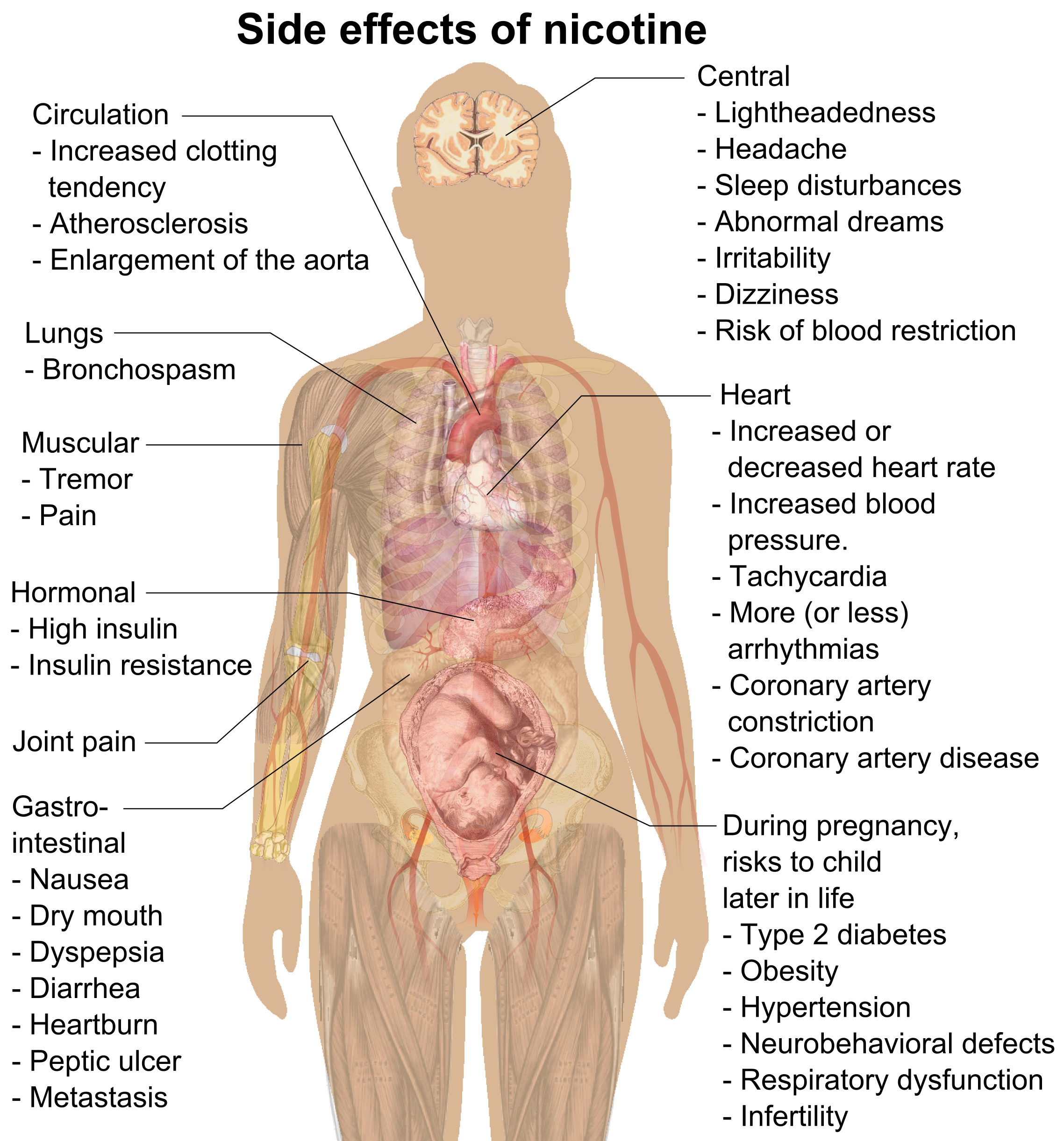
Possible side effects of nicotine

Nicotine is classified as a poison, and it is "extremely hazardous". The CDC says it is "toxic to developing fetuses and is a health danger for pregnant women." It can harm brain development up to age twenty-five, and early use of nicotine can predispose young people to smoking and drug use. However, at doses typically used by consumers, it presents little if any hazard to adult users. Although at low amounts nicotine has a mild analgesic effect, at sufficiently high doses nicotine may result in nausea, vomiting, diarrhea, salivation, bradycardia, and possibly seizures, hypoventilation, and death.

==== Cigarettes and nicotine replacement products ====
E-cigarettes increase serum nicotine levels quicker than nicotine replacement products, but more gradually than traditional cigarettes.

A 2017 study reported that vaping produced comparable levels of nicotine urinary metabolites to tobacco and smokeless tobacco products. However, oxidative nicotine metabolites were less in vapers.

A 2017 review concluded that some vaping products delivered the same amount of nicotine as traditional cigarettes.

In 2018 the National Academies of Sciences, Engineering, and Medicine reported that the degree of dependence is less for e-cigarettes than traditional cigarettes.

=== Aerosol composition ===
The chemical composition of e-cigarette aerosols varies. E-cigarette aerosol is generated when the e-liquid reaches a temperature of roughly 100–250 °C within a chamber, which causes pyrolysis and possible decomposition of other liquid ingredients. The levels of nicotine, TSNAs, aldehydes, metals, volatile organic compounds (VOCs), flavorings, and tobacco alkaloids in e-cigarette vapors vary greatly. The yield of chemicals reported in the e-cigarette vapor varies depending on, several factors, including the e-liquid contents, puffing rate, and the battery voltage.

E-cigarettes consist of fine and ultrafine particles of particulate matter, in the form of an aerosol. The aerosol (mist) produced by an e-cigarette is commonly but inaccurately called vapor. In physics, a vapor is a substance in the gas phase whereas an aerosol is a suspension of tiny particles of liquid, solid or both within a gas. The word "vaping" is not technically accurate when applied to e-cigarettes. The aerosol is made-up of liquid sub-micron particles of condensed vapor; thus, the users of these devices are rather "aerosolizing." This aerosol that is produces looks like cigarette smoke to some extent. After a puff, inhalation of the aerosol travels from the device into the mouth and lungs. The composition of e-liquids varies widely due to the extensive range of nicotine levels and flavoring additives used in these products, which result in a variety of chemical combinations.

=== Metals ===
Metals including nickel, cadmium, lead, chromium, tin, and silicate have been reported in e-cigarette vapor. The device could contribute small amounts of metals in the liquid and vapor, because their metal parts contact the e-liquid.

A 2018 PHE report stated, "[e-cigarettes] that generate minimal metal emissions should become an industry standard."

A 2016 study reported that metals can be carcinogenic, nephrotoxic, neurotoxic, and hemotoxic. A 2018 study reported that copper nanoparticles can induce mitochondrial and DNA injury in lung fibroblasts. DNA repair can be impeded by vaporized titanium dioxide nanoparticles as demonstrated by single-strand DNA breaks and oxidative stress in the DNA of A549 cells. Heavy metals are correlated with serious health issues. Inhaling lead can induce serious neurologic injury, notably to the growing brains of children.

A 2016 review concluded that metals reported in vapor may induce cell damage and initiate inflammatory cytokine such as in human lung fibroblasts. A 2017 review concluded, "E-cigarette aerosols and copper nanoparticles induced mitochondrial ROS production, mitochondrial stress (reduced stability of OxPhos electron transport chain (ETC) complex IV subunit) and DNA fragmentation in lung fibroblasts." A 2017 review linked cadmium to low sperm density.

A 2023 review concluded that the evidence about metals in vapor was not sufficient to create a firm conclusion. It highlighted that prior smoking history was not always appropriately considered in these studies due to long half-life for some metals.

=== First-generation devices ===
Compared to traditional cigarettes, older devices typically produced much lower blood nicotine levels, although a 2014 study reported plasma nicotine concentration which comparable to that of traditional cigarettes. A 2014 study reported that nicotine delivered from e-cigarettes entered the body slower than traditional cigarettes. A 2014 review concluded that inexperienced users obtained moderate amounts of nicotine from e-cigarettes.

==== Tank/adjustable devices ====
Tank or adjustable e-cigarettes, as well as concentrated nicotine liquids, may deliver nicotine at levels similar to traditional cigarettes. A 2017 study reported that nicotine delivery compared to previous generation had increased by 35-72%, elevating heart rates comparable to traditional cigarettes. As of 2017 fourth-generation devices had not been heavily researched.

=== Concerns ===
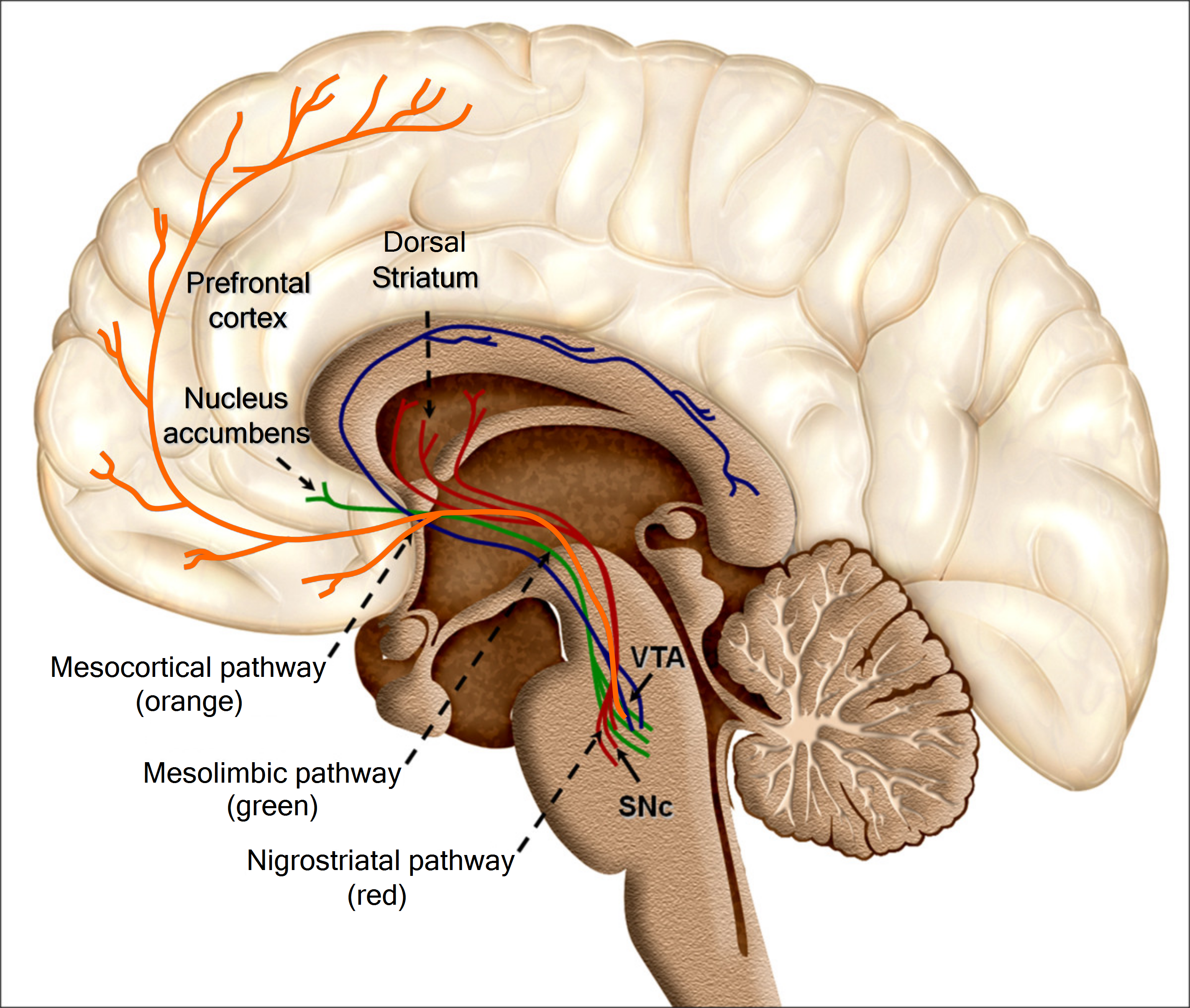
The reinforcing effects of drugs of abuse, such as nicotine, is associated with its ability to excite the mesolimbic and dopaminergic systems. How do e-cigarettes affect the brain? The nicotine in e-liquids readily absorbs into the bloodstream when a person uses an e-cigarette. Upon entering the blood, nicotine stimulates the adrenal glands to release the hormone epinephrine (adrenaline). Epinephrine stimulates the central nervous system and increases blood pressure, breathing, and heart rate. As with most addictive substances, nicotine increases levels of a chemical messenger in the brain called dopamine, which affects parts of the brain that control reward (pleasure from natural behaviors such as eating). These feelings motivate some people to use nicotine again and again, despite possible risks to their health and well-being.

The health effects of long-term nicotine use are unknown. While myriad studies have been conducted, many questions remain unresolved, including impurities in e-liquids.

==== Youth concerns ====
Exposure to e-cigarette components in a susceptible time period of brain development could induce persistent behavioral changes. The FDA stated in 2019 that some vapers experienced seizures; most reports involved youth or young adult users.

==== Pregnancy/lactation ====
A 2016 review concluded that pregnant/breastfeeding women should not substitute cigarettes with e-cigarettes due to the uncertainty about ingredients. The FDA has not approved e-cigarettes as a smoking cessation aid. One study reported increased irritability among infants in those exposed to e-cigarettes or smoking.

A 2022 study recommended quitting smoking altogether through smoking cessation therapy rather than turning to e-cigarettes as an alternative. The U.S. Preventive Services Task Force (USPSTF) recommended that pregnant women adopt behavioral interventions for quitting. Ecigs vaped by pregnant women may increase copd and asthma risk in offspring.

== See also ==
- Health effects of tobacco
- Regulation of e-cigarettes
- List of tobacco-related topics
