= Chain smoking =

Smoking several cigarettes or cigars in succession

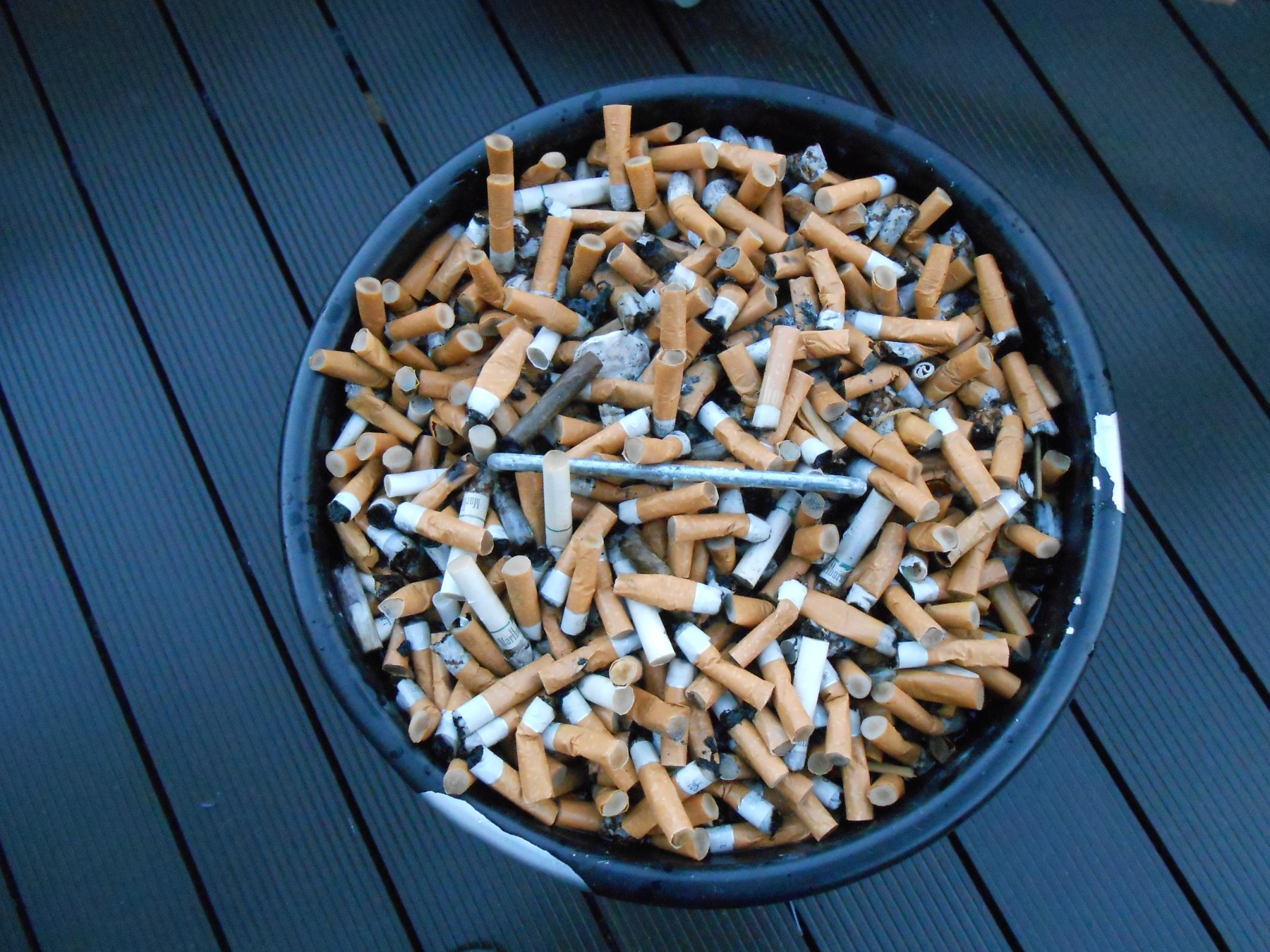
Ashtray with cigarette butts

Chain smoking is the practice of smoking several cigarettes in succession, sometimes using the ember of a finishing cigarette to light the next. The term chain smoker often also refers to a person who smokes relatively constantly, though not necessarily chaining each cigarette. The term applies primarily to cigarettes, although it can be used to describe incessant cigar and pipe smoking as well as vaping and the smoking of other substances such as cannabis. It is a common indicator of addiction.

== Causes ==
The extent to which chain smoking is driven by nicotine dependence has been studied. It does not seem that the amount of nicotine delivered is a significant factor, as the puff volume correlates poorly with the frequency of cigarette consumption.

== Clinical use ==
Chain smoking is given as an example of excessive addictive behavior in the Diagnostic and Statistical Manual of Mental Disorders. It may be used as a form of aversion therapy for smokers who are unused to such heavy smoking, inducing them to give up altogether.

== Ventilation ==
Heating, ventilating, and air conditioning (HVAC) professionals claim that an airflow of about 30 cubic meters per minute per smoker is required to maintain satisfactory air quality when the smokers are chain smoking. As of 2006, research confirms that HVAC systems, while important for general air quality, cannot control exposure to secondhand smoke.

== See also ==
- Binge drinking
- Health effects of tobacco
- Nicotine withdrawal
- Tobacco smoking
