= Effects of nicotine on human brain development =

Effects of cigarettes on the developing human brain

Exposure to nicotine, from conventional or electronic cigarettes during adolescence can impair the developing human brain. E-cigarette use is recognized as a substantial threat to adolescent behavioral health. (Note: From prenatal development through adolescence and early adulthood, exposure to nicotine poses a serious threat, because these are critical times for brain development and brain plasticity. Furthermore, youth and young adults are more vulnerable than adults to the long-term consequences of nicotine exposure, including susceptibility to nicotine addiction and potentially reduced impulse control, deficits in attention and cognition, and mood disorders.) The use of tobacco products, no matter what type, is almost always started and established during adolescence when the developing brain is most vulnerable to nicotine addiction. (Note: A 2018 review found "Nicotine is the third most commonly used substance by adolescents and use of electronic cigarettes has become twice as popular as traditional tobacco products. Concomitantly, e-cigarettes have been found to increase the risk for transitioning to more traditional tobacco cigarettes. Although acute administration of nicotine may enhance cognition in teens and young adults, especially memory and attention, chronic use has been linked with attention and working memory deficits in teens. Acute withdrawal from nicotine in adolescent users has also been associated with abnormal reward processing, working memory, and verbal memory fMRI tasks, highlighting the necessity to measure last use of nicotine prior to neurocognitive assessment.") Young people's brains build synapses faster than adult brains. Because addiction is a form of learning, adolescents can get addicted more easily than adults. The nicotine in e-cigarettes can also prime the adolescent brain for addiction to other drugs such as cocaine. Exposure to nicotine and its great risk of developing an addiction, are areas of significant concern.

Nicotine is a parasympathomimetic stimulant that binds to and activates nicotinic acetylcholine receptors in the brain, which subsequently causes the release of dopamine and other neurotransmitters, such as norepinephrine, acetylcholine, serotonin, gamma-aminobutyric acid, glutamate and endorphins. Nicotine interferes with the blood–brain barrier function, and as a consequence raises the risk of brain edema and neuroinflammation. Another under-studied brain-health marker is cerebral blood flow: a study of adolescents reported that the effects of nicotine and tobacco products on brain-health markers during this neurodevelopmental period remain largely unknown and examined associations with decline in cerebral blood flow in the anterior cingulate cortex (ACC) and precuneus/posterior cingulate cortex (PCC). When nicotine enters the brain it stimulates, among other activities, the midbrain dopaminergic neurons situated in the ventral tegmental area and pars compacta.

Nicotine negatively affects the prefrontal cortex of the developing brain. Prenatal nicotine exposure can result in long-term adverse effects to the developing brain. (Note: Studies of the effects of maternal smoking of conventional cigarettes during pregnancy, coupled with preclinical literature examining the effects of maternal self-administration of nicotine during pregnancy, suggest that e-cigarette use by mothers during pregnancy presents a wide variety of risks to fetal, infant, and child brain development.) Prenatal nicotine exposure has been associated with dysregulation of catecholaminergic, serotonergic, and other neurotransmitter systems. E-liquid exposure whether intentional or unintentional from ingestion, eye contact, or skin contact can cause adverse effects such as seizures and anoxic brain trauma. A study on the offspring of the pregnant mice, which were exposed to nicotine-containing e-liquid, showed significant behavioral alterations. This indicated that exposure to e-cigarette components in a susceptible time period of brain development could induce persistent behavioral changes.

== Effects of nicotine ==
The health effects of long-term nicotine use is unknown. It may be decades before the long-term health effects of nicotine e-cigarette aerosol (vapor) inhalation is known. Short-term nicotine use excites the autonomic ganglia nerves and autonomic nerves, but chronic use seems to induce negative effects on endothelial cells. Nicotine may result in neuroplasticity modifications in the brain. Nicotine has been demonstrated to alter the amounts of brain-derived neurotrophic factor in humans. Side effects of nicotine include mild headache, headache, dysphoria, depressed mood, irritability, aggression, frustration, impatience, anxiety, sleep disturbances, abnormal dreams, irritability, and dizziness. Effects of nicotine vary, depending on how it is consumed. When smoking cigarettes, nicotine is absorbed into the lungs, from inhaling burning tobacco smoke. It then rapidly travels to the brain and increases the levels of the neurotransmitter dopamine, which reinforces the behavior of taking the drug.

The neuroregulation and structural interactions in the brain and lungs from nicotine may interfere with an array of reflexes and responses. These alterations may raise the risk of hypoxia. Continued use of nicotine may result in harmful effects to women's brains because it restricts estrogen signaling. This could lead to making the brain more vulnerable to ischemia. A 2015 review concluded that "Nicotine acts as a gateway drug on the brain, and this effect is likely to occur whether the exposure is from smoking tobacco, passive tobacco smoke or e-cigarettes."

Nicotine may have a profound impact on sleep. The effects on sleep vary after being intoxicated, during withdrawal, and from long-term use. Nicotine may result in arousal and wakefulness, mainly via incitement in the basal forebrain. Nicotine withdrawal, after abstaining from nicotine use in non-smokers, was linked with longer overall length of sleep and REM rebound. A 2016 review states that "Although smokers say they smoke to control stress, studies show a significant increase in cortisol concentrations in daily smokers compared with occasional smokers or nonsmokers. These findings suggest that, despite the subjective effects, smoking may actually worsen the negative emotional states. The effects of nicotine on the sleep-wake cycle through nicotine receptors may have a functional significance. Nicotine receptor stimulation promotes wake time and reduces both total sleep time and rapid eye movement sleep."

Animated nicotine structure.

== Effects of nicotine diagram ==
Possible effects of nicotine on the developing human brain
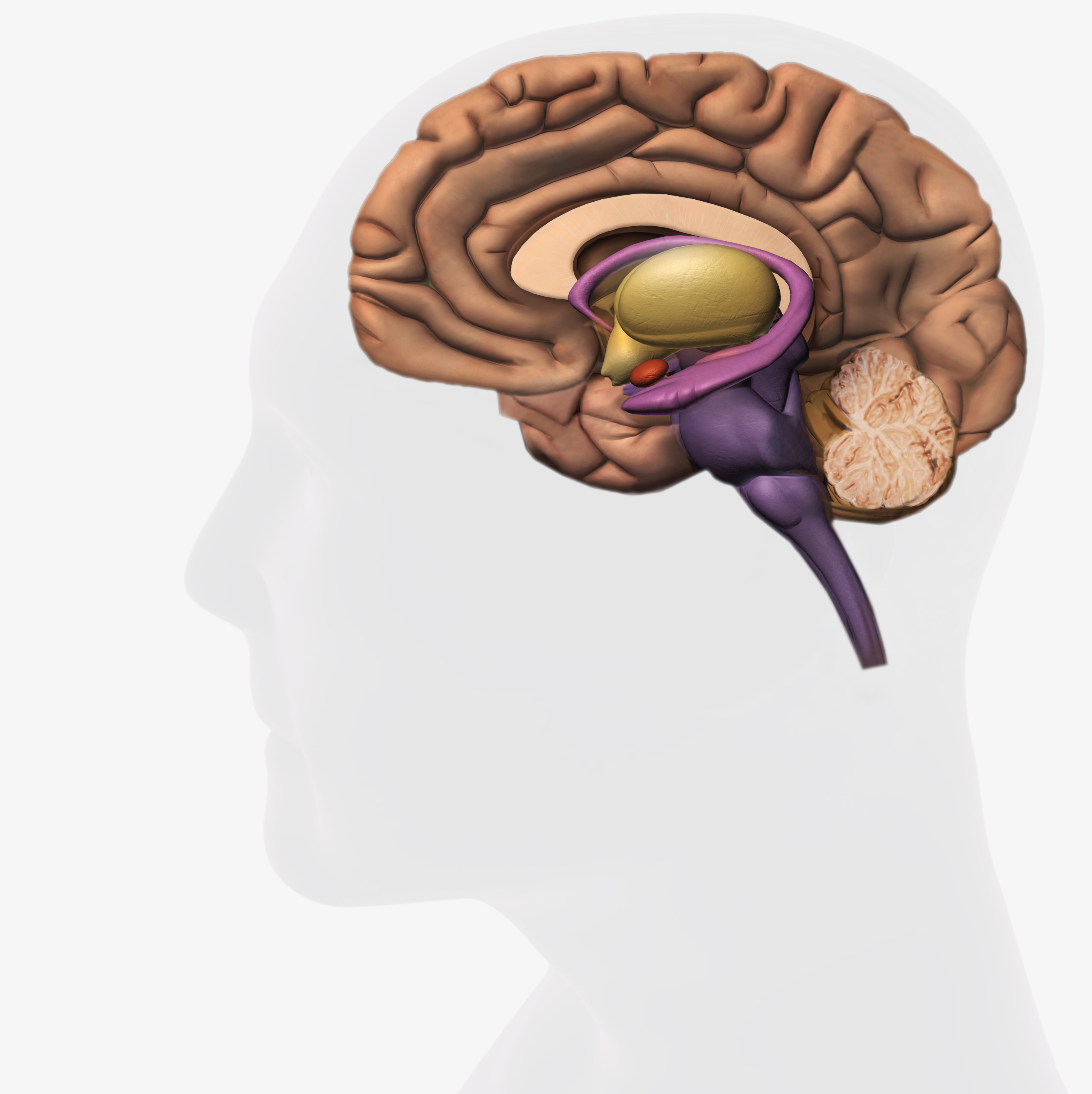
The teen years are critical for brain development, which continues into young adulthood. Young people who use nicotine products in any form, including e-cigarettes, are uniquely at risk for long-lasting effects.

== Comparative risk assessment chart ==
Comparative risk assessment: Potential harms and benefits of vaping (Note: The long-term health risks of e-cigarettes will not be known for decades, although evidence to date suggests that they are generally less harmful than combustible tobacco products. However, less harmful is not the same as harmless. A substantial amount of evidence is available on some components of the e-cigarette aerosols inhaled by e-cigarette users. For many people, exposure to e-cigarette aerosol could occur across much of the life span, beginning in adolescence and even in childhood, when the lungs and brain are still developing.)
Harms	Benefits
Increased youth exposure to nicotine and potentially greater initiation of conventional cigarettes	Reduced disease risk for current smokers who completely switch to e-cigarettes
Slowing cessation by smokers due to nicotine addiction	Reduced disease morbidity for smokers with existing heart or lung disease who switch to e-cigarettes
Nicotine addiction in former smokers who begin to use e-cigarettes and possibly transition back to smoking	Potential for cessation of combustible products
Renormalization of nicotine use and smoking as acceptable	Fewer users of combustible products in the entire population
Future disease risks for youth who are exposed to nicotine
Increasing the dual use of e-cigarettes with combustible products
Serving as a "gateway" to the initiation of tobacco smoking
Increased disease risk vs. complete cessation among those who use both e-cigarettes and combustible products
Exposure to secondhand aerosol and lack of clean air

== Addiction and dependence ==
=== Psychological and physical dependence ===
Nicotine, a key ingredient in most e-liquids, is well-recognized as one of the most addictive substances, as addictive as heroin and cocaine. Addiction is believed to be a disorder of experience-dependent brain plasticity. The reinforcing effects of nicotine play a significant role in the beginning and continuing use of the drug. First-time nicotine users develop a dependence about 32% of the time. Chronic nicotine use involves both psychological and physical dependence. Nicotine-containing e-cigarette aerosol induces addiction-related neurochemical, physiological and behavioral changes.

Nicotine affects neurological, neuromuscular, cardiovascular, respiratory, immunological and gastrointestinal systems. Neuroplasticity within the brain's reward system occurs as a result of long-term nicotine use, leading to nicotine dependence. The neurophysiological activities that are the basis of nicotine dependence are intricate. It includes genetic components, age, gender, and the environment. Pre-existing cognitive and mood disorders may influence the development and maintenance of nicotine dependence.

Nicotine addiction is a disorder which alters different neural systems such as dopaminergic, glutamatergic, GABAergic, serotonergic, that take part in reacting to nicotine. In 2015 the psychological and behavioral effects of e-cigarettes were studied using whole-body exposure to e-cigarette aerosol, followed by a series of biochemical and behavioral studies. The results showed that nicotine-containing e-cigarette aerosol induces addiction-related neurochemical, physiological and behavioral changes.

Long-term nicotine use affects a broad range of genes associated with neurotransmission, signal transduction, and synaptic architecture. The most well-known hereditary influence related to nicotine dependence is a mutation at rs16969968 in the nicotinic acetylcholine receptor CHRNA5, resulting in an amino acid alteration from aspartic acid to asparagine. The single-nucleotide polymorphisms (SNPs) rs6474413 and rs10958726 in CHRNB3 are highly correlated with nicotine dependence. Many other known variants within the CHRNB3–CHRNA6 nicotinic acetylcholine receptors are also correlated with nicotine dependence in certain ethnic groups. There is a relationship between CHRNA5-CHRNA3-CHRNB4 nicotinic acetylcholine receptors and complete smoking cessation.

Increasing evidence indicates that the genetic variant CHRNA5 predicts the response to smoking cessation medicine. The ability to quitting smoking is affected by genetic factors, including genetically based differences in the way nicotine is metabolized. In the CYP450 system there are 173 genetic variants, which impacts how quickly nicotine is metabolizes by each individual. The speed of metabolism impacts the regularity and quantity of nicotine used. For instance, in people who metabolize nicotine gradually their central nervous system effects of nicotine lasts longer, increasing their probability of dependence, but also increasing ability with quitting smoking.

=== Stimulation of the brain ===
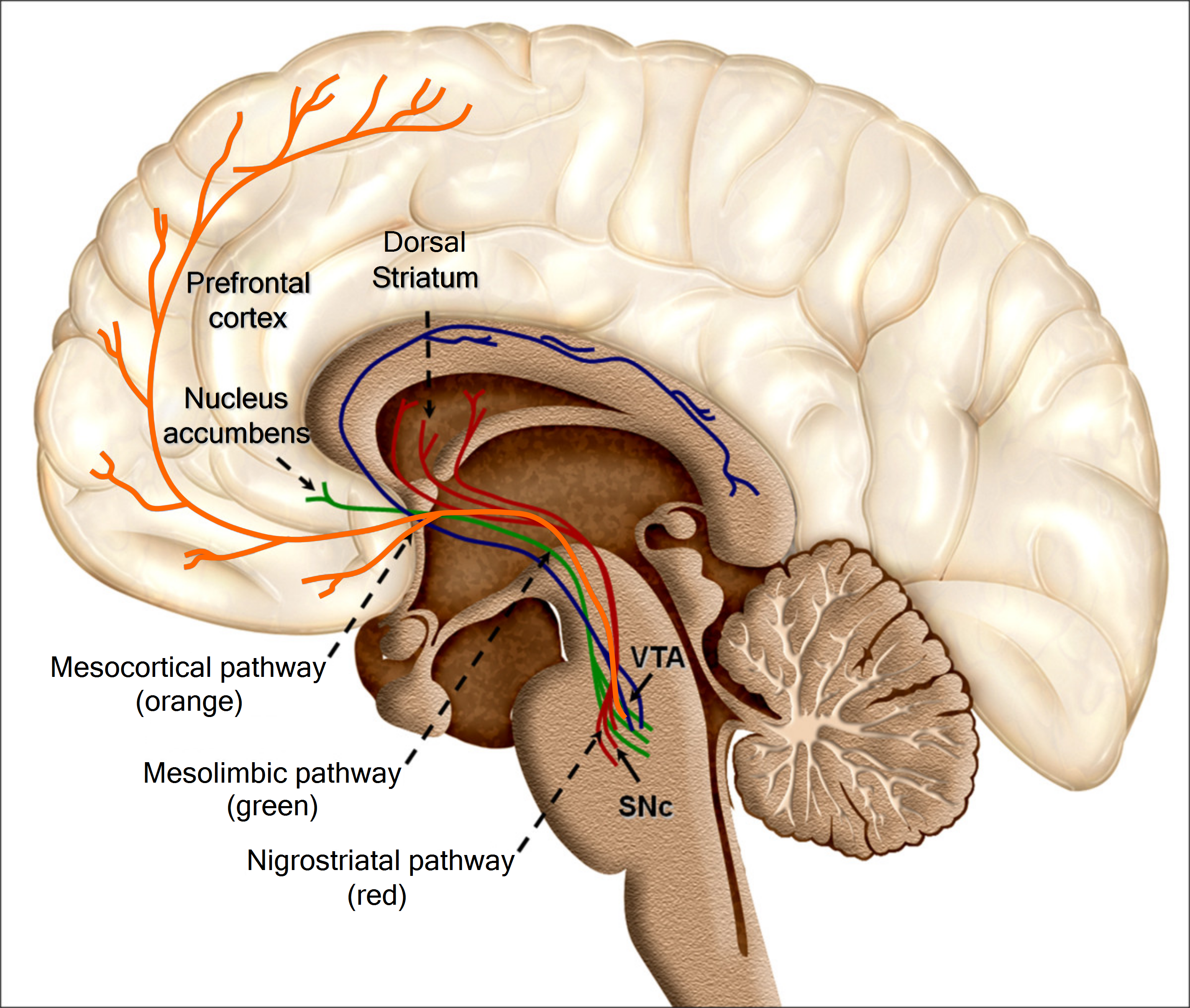
The reinforcing effects of drugs of abuse, such as nicotine, are associated with its ability to excite the mesolimbic and dopaminergic systems. How does the nicotine in e-cigarettes affect the brain? Until about age 25, the brain is still growing. Each time a new memory is created or a new skill is learned, stronger connections – or synapses – are built between brain cells. Young people's brains build synapses faster than adult brains. Because addiction is a form of learning, adolescents can get addicted more easily than adults. The nicotine in e-cigarettes and other tobacco products can also prime the adolescent brain for addiction to other drugs such as cocaine.

Nicotine is a parasympathomimetic stimulant that binds to and activates nicotinic acetylcholine receptors in the brain, which subsequently causes the release of dopamine and other neurotransmitters, such as norepinephrine, acetylcholine, serotonin, gamma-aminobutyric acid, glutamate, endorphins, and several neuropeptides, including proopiomelanocortin-derived α-MSH and adrenocorticotropic hormone. Corticotropin-releasing factor, Neuropeptide Y, orexins, and norepinephrine are involved in nicotine addiction.

Continuous exposure to nicotine can cause an increase in the number of nicotinic receptors, which is believed to be a result of receptor desensitization and subsequent receptor upregulation. Long-term exposure to nicotine can also result in downregulation of glutamate transporter 1. Long-term nicotine exposure upregulates cortical nicotinic receptors, but it also lowers the activity of the nicotinic receptors in the cortical vasodilation region. These effects are not easily understood.

With constant use of nicotine, tolerance occurs at least partially as a result of the development of new nicotinic acetylcholine receptors in the brain. After several months of nicotine abstinence, the number of receptors go back to normal. The extent to which alterations in the brain caused by nicotine use are reversible is not fully understood. Nicotine also stimulates nicotinic acetylcholine receptors in the adrenal medulla, resulting in increased levels of epinephrine and beta-endorphin. Its physiological effects stem from the stimulation of nicotinic acetylcholine receptors, which are located throughout the central and peripheral nervous systems.

The α4β2 nicotinic receptor subtype is the main nicotinic receptor subtype. Nicotine activates brain receptors which produce sedative as well as pleasurable effects. Chronic nicotinic acetylcholine receptor activation from repeated nicotine exposure can induce strong effects on the brain, including changes in the brain's physiology, that result from the stimulation of regions of the brain associated with reward, pleasure, and anxiety. These complex effects of nicotine on the brain are still not well understood.

Nicotine interferes with the blood–brain barrier function, and as a consequence raises the risk of brain edema and neuroinflammation. When nicotine enters the brain it stimulates, among other activities, the midbrain dopaminergic neurons situated in the ventral tegmental area and pars compacta. It induces the release of dopamine in different parts of the brain, such as the nucleus accumbens, amygdala, and hippocampus. Ghrelin-induced dopamine release occurs as a result of the activation of the cholinergic–dopaminergic reward link in the ventral tegmental area, a critical part of the reward areas in the brain related with reinforcement. Ghrelin signaling may affect the reinforcing effects of drug dependence.

=== Discontinuing nicotine use ===
When nicotine intake stops, the upregulated nicotinic acetylcholine receptors induce withdrawal symptoms. These symptoms can include cravings for nicotine, anger, irritability, anxiety, depression, impatience, trouble sleeping, restlessness, hunger, weight gain, and difficulty concentrating. When trying to quit smoking with vaping a base containing nicotine, symptoms of withdrawal can include irritability, restlessness, poor concentration, anxiety, depression, and hunger. The changes in the brain cause a nicotine user to feel abnormal when not using nicotine. In order to feel normal, the user has to keep his or her body supplied with nicotine. E-cigarettes may reduce cigarette craving and withdrawal symptoms.

Limiting tobacco consumption with the use of campaigns that portray cigarette smoking as unacceptable and harmful have been enacted; though, advocating for the use of e-cigarettes jeopardizes this because of the possibility of escalating nicotine addiction. It is not clear whether e-cigarette use will decrease or increase overall nicotine addiction, but the nicotine content in e-cigarettes is adequate to sustain nicotine dependence. Chronic nicotine use causes a broad range of neuroplastic adaptations, making quitting hard to accomplish.

A 2015 study found that users vaping non-nicotine e-liquid exhibited signs of dependence. Experienced users tend to take longer puffs which may result in higher nicotine intake. It is difficult to assess the impact of nicotine dependence from e-cigarette use because of the wide range of e-cigarette products. The addiction potential of e-cigarettes may have risen because as they have progressed, they delivery nicotine better. A 2016 review states that "The highly addictive nature of nicotine is responsible for its widespread use and difficulty with quitting."

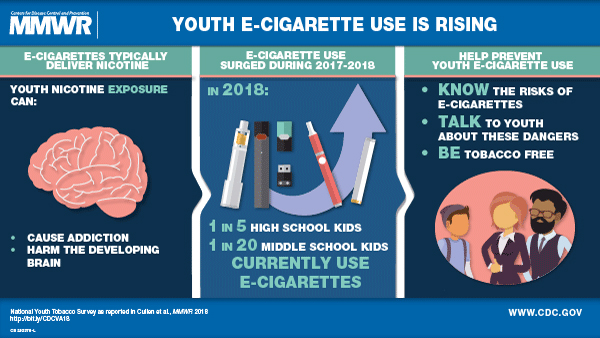
Youth e-cigarette use is rising.

== Young adults and youth ==
=== Addiction and dependence ===
This video from the US Surgeon General advises parents to "Know the Risks," and highlights how e-cigarettes have the potential to cause lasting harm to the health of young users, especially their brain development, which continues until about age 25.

E-cigarettes use by children and adolescents may result in nicotine addiction. Following the possibility of nicotine addiction via e-cigarettes, there is concern that children may start smoking cigarettes. Adolescents are likely to underestimate nicotine's addictiveness. Vulnerability to the brain-modifying effects of nicotine, along with youthful experimentation with e-cigarettes, could lead to a lifelong addiction. A long-term nicotine addiction from using a vape may result in using other tobacco products.

The majority of addiction to nicotine starts during youth and young adulthood. Adolescents are more likely to become nicotine dependent than adults. The adolescent brain seems to be particularly sensitive to neuroplasticity as a result of nicotine. Minimal exposure could be enough to produce neuroplastic alterations in the very sensitive adolescent brain. Exposure to nicotine during adolescence may increase vulnerability to getting addicted to cocaine and other drugs. Nicotine is also associated with causing effects to attention, mood, impulse control and learning since it effects the development of the brain which occurs until the age of 25.

The ability of e-cigarettes to deliver comparable or higher amounts of nicotine compared to traditional cigarettes raises concerns about e-cigarette use generating nicotine dependence among young people. Youth who believe they are vaping without nicotine could still be inhaling nicotine because there are significant differences between declared and true nicotine content.

A 2016 US Surgeon General report concluded that e-cigarette use among young adults and youths is of public health concern. Various organizations, including the International Union Against Tuberculosis and Lung Disease, the American Academy of Pediatrics, the American Cancer Society, the Centers for Disease Control and Prevention, and the US Food and Drug Administration (US FDA), have expressed concern that e-cigarette use could increase the prevalence of nicotine addiction in youth.

Flavored tobacco is especially enticing to youth, and certain flavored tobacco products increase addiction. There is concern that flavored e-cigarettes could have a similar impact on youth. The extent to which teens are using e-cigarettes may lead to addiction or substance dependence in youth, is unknown. A 2017 review noted that "adolescents experience symptoms of dependence at lower levels of nicotine exposure than adults. Consequently, it is harder to reverse addiction originating in this stage compared with later in life."

Adolescents are particularly susceptible to nicotine addiction: the majority (90%) of smokers start before the age of 18, a fact that has been utilized by tobacco companies for decades in their teen-targeted advertising, marketing and even product design. E-cigarette marketing tactics have the possibility to glamorize smoking and enticing children and never smokers, even when such outcomes are unintended. Adolescents may show signs of dependence with even infrequent nicotine use; sustained nicotine exposure leads to upregulation of the receptors in the prefrontal cortex, pathways which are involved in cognitive control, and which are not fully matured until the mid-twenties. Such disruption of neural circuit development may lead to long-term cognitive and behavioral impairment and has been associated with depression and anxiety. Studies show that smokers who started as an adolescent are more likely to develop psychiatric disease.

The nicotine content in e-cigarettes varies widely by product and by use. Refill solutions may contain anywhere from 1.8% nicotine (18 mg/mL) to over 5% (59 mg/mL). Nicotine delivery may be affected by the device itself, for example, by increasing the voltage which changes the aerosol delivered, or by "dripping"—a process of inhaling liquid poured directly onto coils. The latest generation of e-cigarettes, "pod products," such as Juul, have the highest nicotine content (59 mg/mL), in protonated salt, rather than the free-base nicotine form found in earlier generations, which makes it easier for less experienced users to inhale. Recent studies treat e-cigarette formulations as a relevant exposure context for brain development. Nicotine salt e-cigarettes have been associated with higher levels of nicotine exposure among adolescents who vape. Studies also show that nicotine salt formulations can efficiently deliver nicotine to the brain. Despite the clear presence of nicotine in e-cigarettes, adolescents often do not recognize this fact, potentially fueling misperceptions about the health risks and addictive potential of e-cigarettes. Studies show that teens have been experimenting with vapes, with usage peaking among youth around 2019. Since then, usage has declined. In 2024, a CDC study showed that 5.9% of middle and high school students used e-cigarettes, vapes, and other electronic nicotine delivery systems (ENDS). Vapes remained the most commonly used tobacco product among U.S. youths.

In the US, the unprecedented increase in current (past-month) users from 11.7% of high school students in 2017 to 20.8% in 2018 would imply dependence, if not addiction, given what we know about nicotine and its effects on the adolescent brain. Two recent studies in 2018 utilized validated measures to identify nicotine dependence in e-cigarette using adolescents. Exposure to nicotine from certain types of e-cigarettes may be higher than that from traditional cigarettes. For example, in a study in 2018 of adolescent pod users, their urinary cotinine (a breakdown product used to measure nicotine exposure) levels were higher than levels seen in adolescent cigarette smokers.

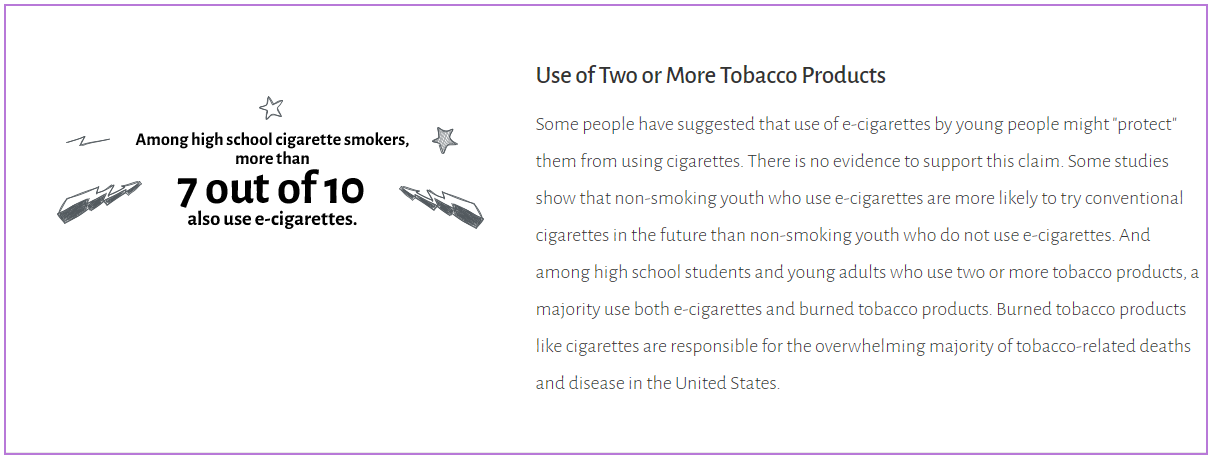
Graphic from the 2019 US Surgeon General's report entitled Use of Two or More Tobacco Products.

=== Effects on the brain ===
Both preadolescence and adolescence are developmental periods associated with increased vulnerability to nicotine addiction, and exposure to nicotine during these periods may lead to long-lasting changes in behavioral and neuronal plasticity. Nicotine has more significant and durable damaging effects on adolescent brains compared to adult brains, the former suffering more harmful effects. Preclinical animal studies have shown that in rodent models, nicotinic acetylcholine receptor signaling is still actively changing during adolescence, with higher expression and functional activity of nicotinic acetylcholine receptors in the forebrain of adolescent rodents compared to their adult counterparts.

In rodent models, nicotine actually enhances neuronal activity in several reward-related regions and does so more robustly in adolescents than in adults. This increased sensitivity to nicotine in the reward pathways of adolescent rats is associated with enhanced behavioral responses, such as strengthening the stimulus response reward for administration of nicotine. In conditioned place-preference tests—where reward is measured by the amount of time animals spend in an environment where they receive nicotine compared to an environment where nicotine is not administered—adolescent rodents have shown an increased sensitivity to the rewarding effects of nicotine at very low doses (0.03 mg/kg) and exhibited a unique vulnerability to oral self-administration during the early-adolescent period.

Adolescent rodents also have shown higher levels of nicotine self-administration than adults, decreased sensitivity to the aversive effects of nicotine, and less prominent withdrawal symptoms following chronic nicotine exposure. This characteristic in rodent models of increased positive and decreased negative short-term effects of nicotine during adolescence (versus adulthood) highlights the possibility that human adolescents might be particularly vulnerable to developing dependency to and continuing to use e-cigarettes.

The teen years are critical for brain development, which continues into young adulthood. Young people who use nicotine products in any form, including e-cigarettes, are uniquely at risk for long-lasting effects. Because nicotine affects the development of the brain's reward system, continued e-cigarette use can not only lead to nicotine addiction, but it also can make other drugs such as cocaine and methamphetamine more pleasurable to a teen's developing brain. Concerns exist in respect to adolescence vaping due to studies indicating nicotine may potentially have harmful effects on the brain. Nicotine exposure during adolescence adversely affects cognitive development. Although human neuroimaging evidence remains limited, a 2024 study of participants aged 16–22 found an association between the recent use of nicotine and tobacco products, hippocampal morphometry and memory-related brain–behaviour relationships during late adolescence and young adulthood.

Children are more sensitive to nicotine than adults. The use of products containing nicotine in any form among youth, including in e-cigarettes, is unsafe. Animal research indicates strong evidence that the limbic system, which modulates drug reward, cognition, and emotion, is growing during adolescence and is particularly vulnerable to the long lasting effects of nicotine. In youth, nicotine is associated with cognitive impairment as well as the chance of getting addicted for life.

The adolescent's developing brain is especially sensitive to the harmful effects of nicotine. A short period of regular or occasional nicotine exposure in adolescence exerts long-term neurobehavioral damage. Risks of exposing the developing brain to nicotine include mood disorders and permanent lowering of impulse control. The rise in vaping is of great concern because the parts encompassing in greater cognitive activities including the prefrontal cortex of the brain continues to develop into the 20s. Nicotine exposure during brain development may hamper growth of neurons and brain circuits, effecting brain architecture, chemistry, and neurobehavioral activity.

Nicotine changes the way synapses are formed, which can harm the parts of the brain that control attention and learning. Preclinical studies indicate that teens being exposed to nicotine interferes with the structural development of the brain, inducing lasting alterations in the brain's neural circuits. Nicotine affects the development of brain circuits that control attention and learning. Other risks include mood disorders and permanent problems with impulse control—failure to fight an urge or impulse that may harm oneself or others. Each e-cigarette brand differs in the exact amount of ingredients and nicotine in each product. Therefore, little is known regarding the health consequences of each brand to the growing brains of youth.

E-cigarettes are a source of potential developmental toxicants. E-cigarette aerosol, e-liquids, flavoring, and the metallic coil can cause oxidative stress, and the growing brain is uniquely susceptible to the detrimental effects of oxidative stress. As indicated in the limited research from animal studies, there is the potential for induced changes in neurocognitive growth among children who have been subjected to e-cigarette aerosols consisting of nicotine. The US FDA stated in 2019 that some people who use e-cigarettes have experienced seizures, with most reports involving youth or young adult users. Inhaling lead from e-cigarette aerosol can induce serious neurologic injury, notably to the growing brains of children.

A 2017 review states that "Because the brain does not reach full maturity until the mid-20s, restricting sales of electronic cigarettes and all tobacco products to individuals aged at least 21 years and older could have positive health benefits for adolescents and young adults." Adverse effects to the health of children is mostly not known. Children subjected to e-cigarettes had a higher likelihood of having more than one adverse effect and effects were more significant, than with children subjected to traditional cigarettes. Significant harmful effects were cyanosis, nausea, and coma, among others.

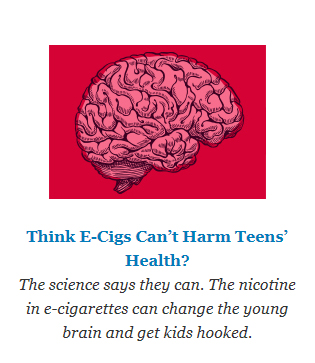
Effects of nicotine on the human brain.

== Effects of nicotine on fetal development diagram ==
Possible effects of nicotine on the developing human fetal brain
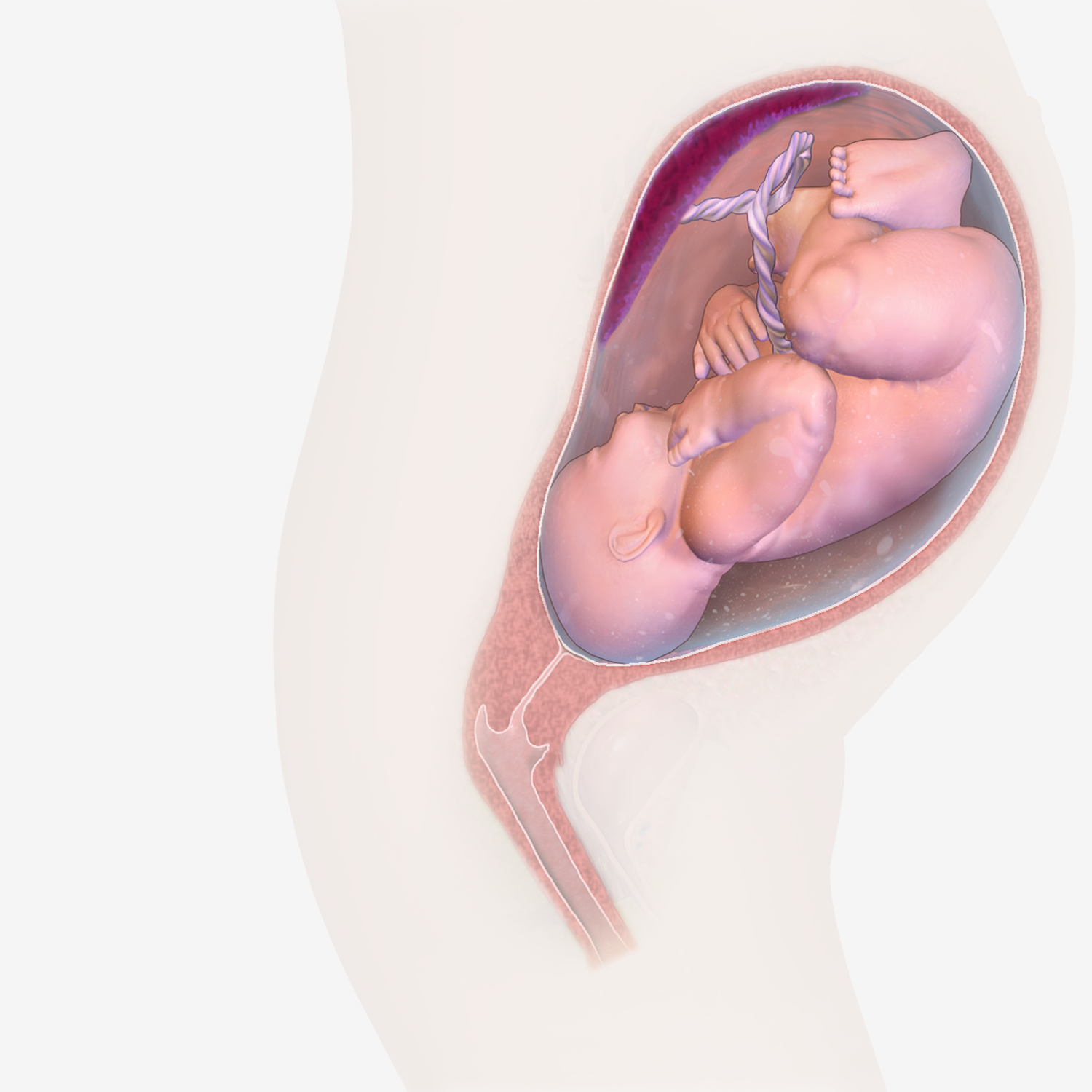
Nicotine exposure during pregnancy can harm fetal brain development.

== Fetal development ==
There is accumulating research concerning the negative effects of nicotine on prenatal brain development. (Note: Fetal exposure to nicotine during pregnancy can result in multiple adverse consequences, including sudden infant death syndrome, altered corpus callosum, auditory processing deficits, effects on behaviors and obesity, and deficits in attention and cognition.) Vaping during pregnancy can be harmful to the fetus. There is no supporting evidence demonstrating that vaping is safe for use in pregnant women. Nicotine accumulates in the fetus because it goes through the placenta. Nicotine has been found in placental tissue as early as seven weeks of embryonic gestation, and nicotine concentrations are higher in fetal fluids than in maternal fluids. Nicotine can lead to vasoconstriction of uteroplacental vessels, reducing the delivery of both nutrients and oxygen to the fetus.

As a result, nutrition is re-distributed to prioritize vital organs, such as the heart and the brain, at the cost of less vital organs, such as the liver, kidneys, adrenal glands, and pancreas, leading to underdevelopment and functional disorders later in life. Nicotine attaches to nicotinic acetylcholine receptors in the fetus brain. The stage when the human brain is developing is possibly the most sensitive time period to the effects of nicotine. When the brain is being developed, activating or desensitizing nicotinic acetylcholine receptors by being exposed to nicotine can result in long-term developmental disturbances.

Prenatal nicotine exposure has been associated with dysregulation of catecholaminergic, serotonergic, and other neurotransmitter systems. Prenatal nicotine exposure is associated with preterm birth, stillbirth, sudden infant death syndrome, auditory processing complications, changes to the corpus callosum, changes in brain metabolism, changes in neurological systems, changes in neurotransmitter systems, changes in normal brain development, lower birth weights compared to other infants, and a reduction in brain weight.

A 2017 review states, "because nicotine targets the fetal brain, damage can be present, even when birth weight is normal." A 2014 US Surgeon General report found "that nicotine adversely affects maternal and fetal health during pregnancy, and that exposure to nicotine during fetal development has lasting adverse consequences for brain development." Nicotine prenatal exposure is associated with behavioral abnormalities in adults and children. Prenatal nicotine exposure may result in persisting, multigenerational changes in the epigenome.

Reviews have linked prenatal nicotine exposure with later neurodevelopmental and neurobehavioral outcomes in offspring. A longitudinal cohort study conducted in 2025 and based on data from the Adolescent Brain Cognitive Development (ABCD) Study reported that maternal tobacco use during pregnancy was associated with lower cortical grey–white matter across the whole cortex and a smaller caudate nucleus volume in children. A 2023 review summarized clinical and preclinical evidence indicating that prenatal nicotine exposure may increase the risk of disorders such as attention-deficit hyperactivity disorder (ADHD), anxiety, and depression and may alter underlying brain circuitry and brain volume. A 2025 review of infant magnetic resonance imaging (MRI) studies reported that the existing research on prenatal substance exposure, including nicotine, has implicated cortical and subcortical gray and white matter regions, but noted important limitations such as small sample sizes and co-occurring exposures.

Health effects of using e-cigarettes.

== Effects of e-cigarette liquid ==
E-liquid exposure whether intentional or unintentional from ingestion, eye contact, or skin contact can cause adverse effects such as seizures and anoxic brain trauma. The nicotine in e-liquids readily absorbs into the bloodstream when a person uses an e-cigarette. Upon entering the blood, nicotine stimulates the adrenal glands to release the hormone epinephrine. Epinephrine stimulates the central nervous system and increases blood pressure, breathing, and heart rate.

As with most addictive substances, nicotine increases levels of a chemical messenger in the brain called dopamine, which affects parts of the brain that control reward (pleasure from natural behaviors such as eating). These feelings motivate some people to use nicotine again and again, despite possible risks to their health and well-being.

A 2015 study on the offspring of the pregnant mice, which were exposed to nicotine-containing e-liquid, showed significant behavioral alterations. This indicated that exposure to e-cigarette components in a susceptible time period of brain development could induce persistent behavioral changes. E-cigarette aerosols without containing nicotine could harm the growing conceptus. This indicates that the ingredients in the e-liquid, such as the flavors, could be developmental toxicants.

== Gallery ==
E-cigarette related videos

Robbing the Future - Advertising Aimed at Children.

E-cigarettes - An Emerging Public Health Challenge.

Tobacco Use By Youth Is Rising – February 2019 – Vital Signs.

Nicotine & Vaping - Don't Get Hacked - The Real Cost.

Julius Dein Doing A Magic Trick on A Vape - The Real Cost.

== Bibliography ==
- McNeill, A; Brose, LS; Calder, R; Bauld, L; Robson, D (February 2018). "Evidence review of e-cigarettes and heated tobacco products 2018" (PDF). UK: Public Health England. pp. 1–243.
- Stratton, Kathleen; Kwan, Leslie Y.; Eaton, David L. (January 2018). Stratton, Kathleen; Kwan, Leslie Y.; Eaton, David L. (eds.). Public Health Consequences of E-Cigarettes (PDF). National Academies of Sciences, Engineering, and Medicine (National Academies Press). pp. 1–774. Bibcode:2018nap..book24952N. doi:10.17226/24952. ISBN 978-0-309-46834-3. PMID 29894118.
- "E-Cigarette Use Among Youth and Young Adults: A Report of the Surgeon General" (PDF). United States Department of Health and Human Services. Surgeon General of the United States. 2016. pp. 1–298.
- "State Health Officer's Report on E-Cigarettes: A Community Health Threat" (PDF). California Tobacco Control Program. California Department of Public Health. January 2015. pp. 1–21.
- "Electronic nicotine delivery systems" (PDF). World Health Organization. 21 July 2014. pp. 1–13.
- National Center for Chronic Disease Prevention Health Promotion (US) Office on Smoking Health (2014). The Health Consequences of Smoking—50 Years of Progress: A Report of the Surgeon General. Surgeon General of the United States. pp. 1–943. PMID 24455788.
