= Nicotine withdrawal =

Process of withdrawing from nicotine addiction

- Nicotine molecule
- Specialty: Addiction medicine, Psychiatry
- Symptoms: Cravings for nicotine, anger or irritability, anxiety, depression, insomnia, restlessness, increased appetite, difficulty concentrating
- Usual onset: 2–3 hours after last intake of nicotine
- Duration: 2–4 weeks
- Causes: Cessation of nicotine use in a state of dependence
- Diagnostic method: Based on symptoms
- Treatment: Nicotine replacement therapy, cognitive behavioral therapy, medication
- Medication: Varenicline, bupropion, cytisine, nortriptyline

Nicotine withdrawal is a group of symptoms that occur in the first few weeks after stopping or decreasing use of nicotine. Symptoms include intense cravings for nicotine, anger or irritability, anxiety, depression, impatience, trouble sleeping, restlessness, hunger, weight gain, and difficulty concentrating. Withdrawal symptoms make it harder to quit nicotine products, and many smoking cessation methods aim to reduce these symptoms. Smoking cessation programs can help increase the chances of success. Nicotine withdrawal is recognized in both the American Psychiatric Association's Diagnostic and Statistical Manual of Mental Disorders (DSM) and the WHO's International Classification of Diseases (ICD).

== Signs and symptoms ==
The most documented symptoms of nicotine withdrawal are cravings for nicotine, anger or irritability, anxiety, depression, impatience, trouble sleeping, restlessness, hunger, and difficulty concentrating. Symptoms are usually strongest for the first few days and then dissipate over 2–4 weeks. The most common symptoms are irritability, anxiety, and difficulty concentrating, while depression and insomnia are the least common. Other withdrawal symptoms may include anhedonia, constipation, cough, decreased positive affect, dizziness, drowsiness, headache, impulsivity, fatigue, flu-like symptoms, mood swings, mouth ulcers, and increased dreaming. Cessation of nicotine can also require changes in levels of various medications.

== Causes ==
Various factors have been proposed to account for nicotine withdrawal. Nicotine binds to nicotinic receptors in the brain that, in turn, cause an increase in dopamine. Dopamine is the major chemical that stimulates reward centers in the brain. The brain recruits an opposing force to dampen the effects of nicotine and this causes tolerance (the reduction in the effect of nicotine). The onset of this opposing force and the fact that the brain becomes used to and dependent on nicotine to function normally is known as physical dependence. When nicotine intake is decreased, the brain's opposing force is now unopposed and this causes withdrawal symptoms. It also appears that opiate, serotonergic, glutamic, cannabinoid, and corticotrophin receptors may play a role in nicotine withdrawal. In addition, smoking becomes conditioned to environmental cues that can then prompt withdrawal symptoms. In the brain, the dorsal striatum may be associated with physical (motor) but not affective withdrawal sign.

== Treatment ==
Gradually reducing nicotine intake causes less withdrawal than abruptly stopping. Another way to reduce nicotine withdrawal symptoms is to provide the body with an alternative source of nicotine (nicotine replacement therapy) for a temporary period and then taper this new nicotine intake. Other medication used for quitting smoking include bupropion, varenicline, cytisine, nortriptyline, and clonidine. Treatments other than medication, such as increased exercise, can also reduce nicotine withdrawal symptoms. Many behavior changes such as avoiding situations where one usually smoked, planning ahead to deal with temptations, and seeking the support of friends and family are effective in helping people quit smoking, but whether this is due to reduced withdrawal is unclear.

== Epidemiology ==
Most nicotine users have at least one of the above withdrawal symptoms when they try to stop. These effects are much milder in those who use isolated nicotine over tobacco. Withdrawal can occur in less frequent users, but heavier users and those with a past or current psychiatric disorder tend to have more severe withdrawal. Genetics also influence the severity of withdrawal.

== See also ==
- Drug withdrawal
- Smoking cessation
- Nicotine dependence
