= GTS =

GTS may refer to:

== Organisations ==
- Game Technology Solutions, a Sri Lankan game development studio
- Game Theory Society, a society for the promotion of research, teaching and application of game theory
- Global Trading Systems, an American proprietary trading and market making firm
- Good Thinking Society, a British skeptical organisation
- Global Telecommunications System, the communication system for meteorological data

=== Education ===
- General Theological Seminary, in New York City, US
- Grace Theological Seminary, in Winona Lake, Indiana, US
- Great Torrington School, in Devon, England

== Transport ==
- Gas Turbine Ship, used as a ship prefix
- Geelong Transit System, in Victoria, Australia
- The Granites Airport (IATA airport code), Northern Territory, Australia
- Gran Turismo Special, or Gran Turismo Spider, or Gran Turismo Sport, a grand tourer appellation used by several automobiles, including:
  - Dodge Viper GTS
  - Farboud GTS
  - Ferrari 330 GTS
  - Ferrari 365 GTS
  - HSV GTS
  - Lightning GTS
  - Toyota 86 GTS
  - Vespa GTS, a scooter manufactured by Piaggio under the Vespa brand
  - GTS models, of the Porsche 911
  - GTS models, of the Porsche Boxster and Cayman
- GTS Rail Operations

== Science and technology ==
- GeForce2 GTS, a model of GPU marketed by Nvidia
- Geologic time scale, a system of chronological dating that relates geological strata to time
- Gilles de la Tourette syndrome, or Tourette's syndrome, a neurodevelopmental disorder
- GNU Triangulated Surface, a library of algorithms for handling surface meshes; see Geometric modeling kernel
- Global Telecommunications System, a global network for the transmission of meteorological data
- Green Tobacco Sickness, a type of nicotine poisoning

== Other uses ==
- Go to Sleep (wrestling), a professional wrestling attack
- Grand Touring Supreme, a category in the IMSA GT Championship
- Greenwich Time Signal, a series of six short tones broadcast at one-second intervals by many BBC Radio stations
- GTS/BKN, a television channel in South Australia
- Giant tiny sex, fetish subculture slang for macrophilia
- Gran Turismo Sport, a video racing game released in 2017
