= Regional Specialized Meteorological Centre =

A Regional Specialized Meteorological Centre (RSMC) is responsible for the distribution of information, advisories, and warnings regarding the specific program they have a part of, agreed by consensus at the World Meteorological Organization as part of the World Weather Watch.

== Environmental emergency response programme ==
As a result of the poor communications between countries following the Chernobyl disaster in the Spring of 1986, the World Meteorological Organization (WMO) was requested by the International Atomic Energy Agency (IAEA) and other international organizations to arrange for early warning messages about nuclear accidents to be transmitted over the Global Telecommunications System (GTS). In addition some WMO member countries that lacked extensive forecasting capability requested that specialized pollutant transport and dispersion forecasts be provided during these emergencies. As a result, during 1989 Meteo-France (MF), Environment Canada (EC) and the United Kingdom's Met Office (UKMO) were all set up as RSMCs under interim arrangements between the WMO and the IAEA. Under these arrangements Meteo-France provided global coverage with the UKMO as the backup centre until each WMO region had at least two RSMCs for transport model products. The need for the rationalization of transport and dispersion forecasts became even more apparent during the oil fire emergency after the Persian Gulf War, when several organizations provided personnel on the ground with predictions of the smoke plume behaviour which were often misleading as there was no existing and well-recognized system to sort out the predictions from less experienced sources.

After it had successfully demonstrated its RSMC capabilities to the WMO's Commission for Basic Systems (CBS) during November 1992, the United States National Oceanic and Atmospheric Administration was made the fourth RSMC effective on July 1, 1993. This resulted in the WMO regions RA and RA IV having two RSMCs each which indicated the need to revise the interim arrangements. The new arrangements came into force in August 1994, with EC and NOAA responsible for the Americas, while MF and the UKMO covered the remaining parts of the World. The Australian Bureau of Meteorology was subsequently made an RSMC on 1 July 1995, while the Japan Meteorological Agency was made one in July 1997.

In 2021 there were ten meteorological centres for distribution of transport, deposition, and dispersion modeling, in the event of an environmental catastrophe that crosses international borders:

- Beijing, China
- Exeter, United Kingdom
- Melbourne, Australia
- Montréal, Canada
- Obninsk, Russia
- Offenbach, Germany
- Tokyo, Japan
- Toulouse, France
- Vienna, Austria
- Washington, D.C., United States

== Tropical cyclones ==
A Tropical Cyclone Regional Specialized Meteorological Centre is responsible for detecting tropical cyclones in its designated area of responsibility, and for providing basic information about the systems present and their forecast position, movement and intensity. There are six such meteorological centres in addition to four regional Tropical Cyclone Warning Centres (TCWCs) that all provide public tropical cyclone advisory messages and assist other National Meteorological and Hydrological Services in preparing alerts and warnings for their respective countries. In addition, all of the centres are responsible for naming tropical cyclones when they develop into or become equivalent to tropical storms in their area of responsibility, with the exceptions of RSMC La Reunion and TCWC Wellington.

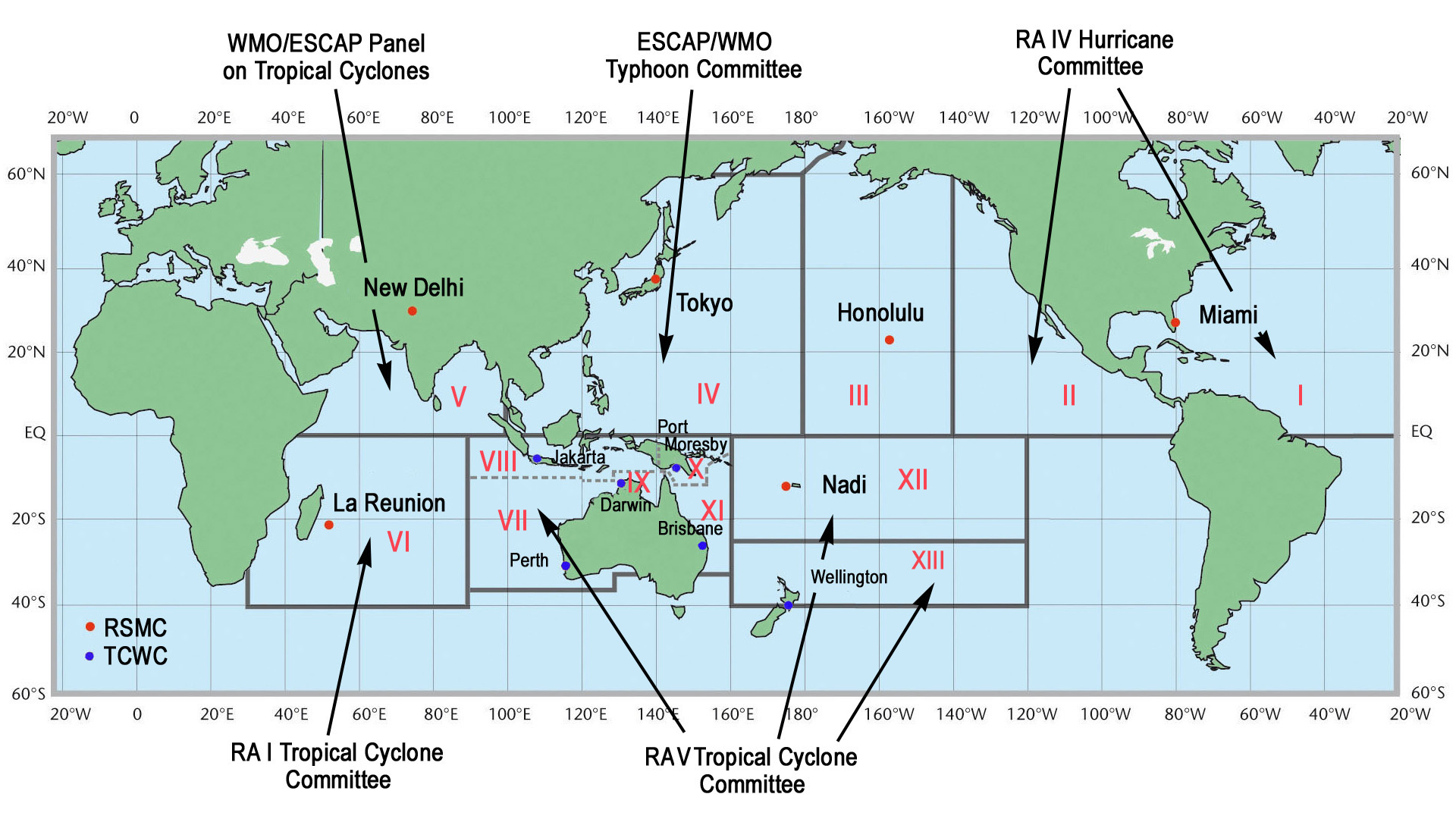
The tropical cyclone centres and regions

- The United States National Hurricane Center (NHC/RSMC Miami) is responsible for the tracking of tropical cyclones within the Atlantic Ocean and Eastern Pacific basins.
- The United States Central Pacific Hurricane Center (CPHC/RSMC Honolulu) provides satellite fixes for the Western Pacific and Southern Pacific basins and tropical cyclone warnings for the Central Pacific basin and in the Eastern Pacific basin if the NHC is too busy with the Atlantic basin or is incapacitated in any way.
- The Japan Meteorological Agency (JMA/RSMC Tokyo) is responsible for issuing advisories within the Western Pacific basin.
- The India Meteorological Department (IMD/RSMC New Delhi) is responsible for tracking tropical cyclones within the North Indian Ocean.
- MFR/RSMC La Réunion (Météo-France) is responsible for the issuing advisories and tracking of tropical cyclones in the southwest Indian Ocean.
- The Australian Bureau of Meteorology (BOM/TCWC Melbourne), the Indonesian Meteorology, Climatology, and Geophysical Agency (BMKG/TCWC Jakarta) and the Papua New Guinea National Weather Service (TCWC Port Moresby) are responsible for the naming and tracking of tropical cyclones within the Australian region.
- Within the Southern Pacific the Fiji Meteorological Service (FMS, RSMC Nadi) is responsible for the naming of tropical cyclones for the whole basin, however, the Meteorological Service of New Zealand (MetService, TCWC Wellington) issues forecasts for the area below 25°S.
- Although the South Atlantic is not officially considered a tropical cyclone basin, starting 2011, the Brazilian Navy Hydrographic Center has developed three naming lists used to identify cyclones that form south of the equator and west of longitude 20 degrees west.

== See also ==
- Tropical cyclone
- Tropical cyclone naming
- World Meteorological Organization
