= Cultivation of tobacco =

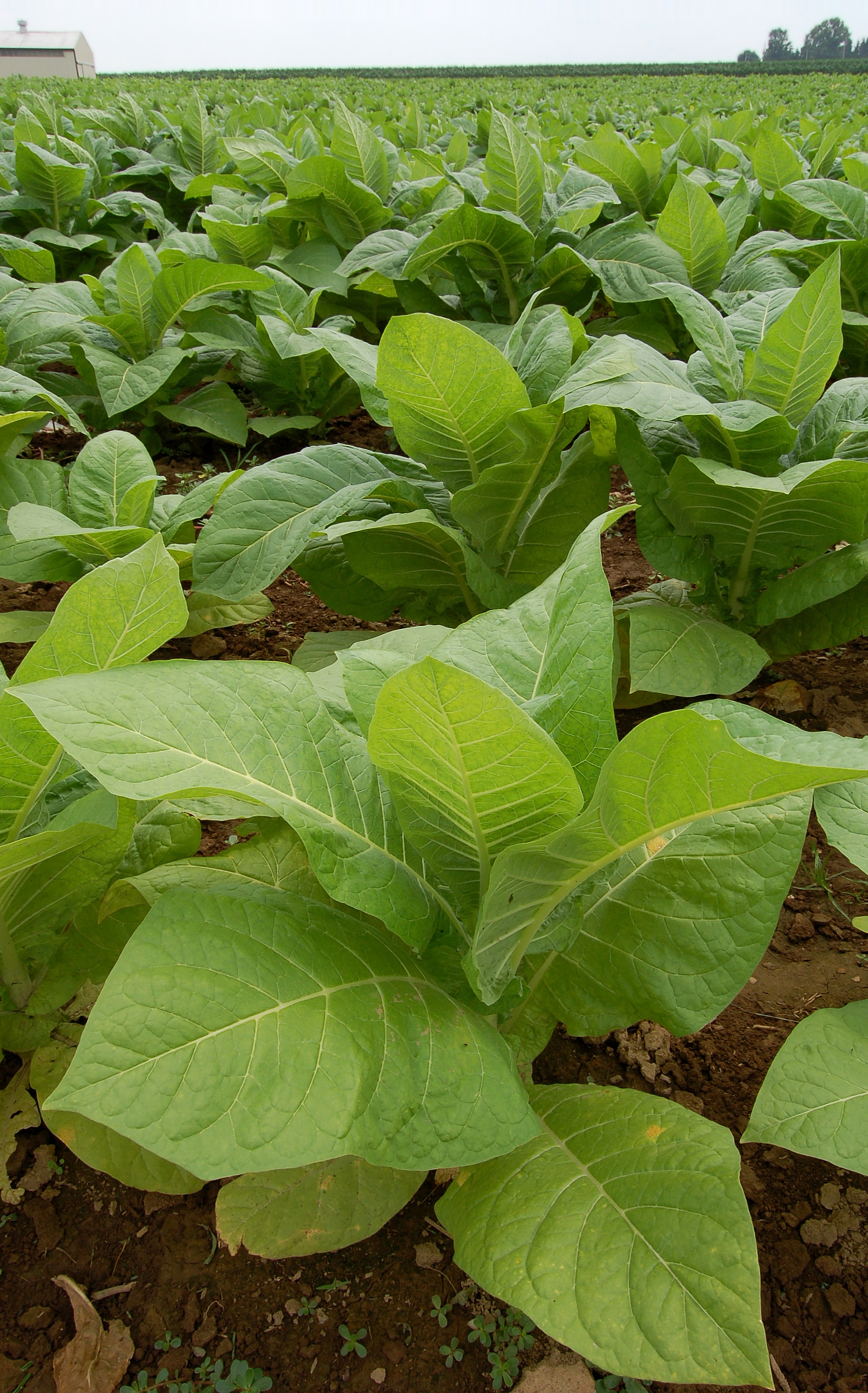
Tobacco plants growing in a field in Intercourse, Pennsylvania, 2006

The cultivation of tobacco usually takes place annually. The tobacco is germinated in cold frames or hotbeds and then transplanted to the field until it matures. It is grown in warm climates with rich, well-drained soil. About 4.2 million hectares of tobacco were under cultivation worldwide in 2000, yielding over seven million tonnes of tobacco.

== Sowing and growth ==
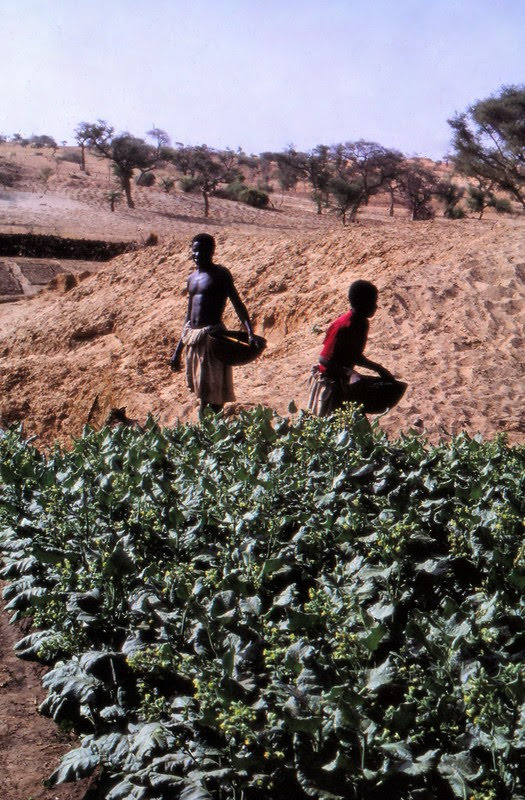
Tobacco cultivation in a dry river bed, Tireli, Mali, 1980

Tobacco seeds are scattered onto the surface of the soil, as their germination is activated by light. In colonial Virginia, seedbeds were fertilized with wood ash or animal manure (frequently powdered horse manure). Seedbeds were then covered with branches to protect the young plants from frost damage, and the plants were left alone until around April.

In the 19th century, young plants came under increasing attack from certain types of flea beetles, Epitrix cucumeris or Epitrix pubescens, which destroyed half the U.S. tobacco crops in 1876. In the years afterward, many experiments were attempted and discussed to control the flea beetle. By 1880, growers discovered that replacing the branches with a frame covered with thin fabric effectively protected plants from the beetle. This practice spread, becoming ubiquitous in the 1890s.

In Asia, Oceania, and the Indian subcontinent, the tobacco cutworm (Spodoptera litura) is a great pest to the tobacco plant. The caterpillar's vigorous eating habits can cause up to 23-50% in yield losses, resulting in economic strain to the local agricultural economies. The cabbage looper is also known to have caused damage to tobacco plants in North Carolina, which became a concern as farmers lacked a suitable method for controlling the caterpillars.

Shade tobacco is the practice of growing the plants under a screen of cheesecloth fabric. The thin leaves were used for the outer wrappings of cigars.

== Harvest ==
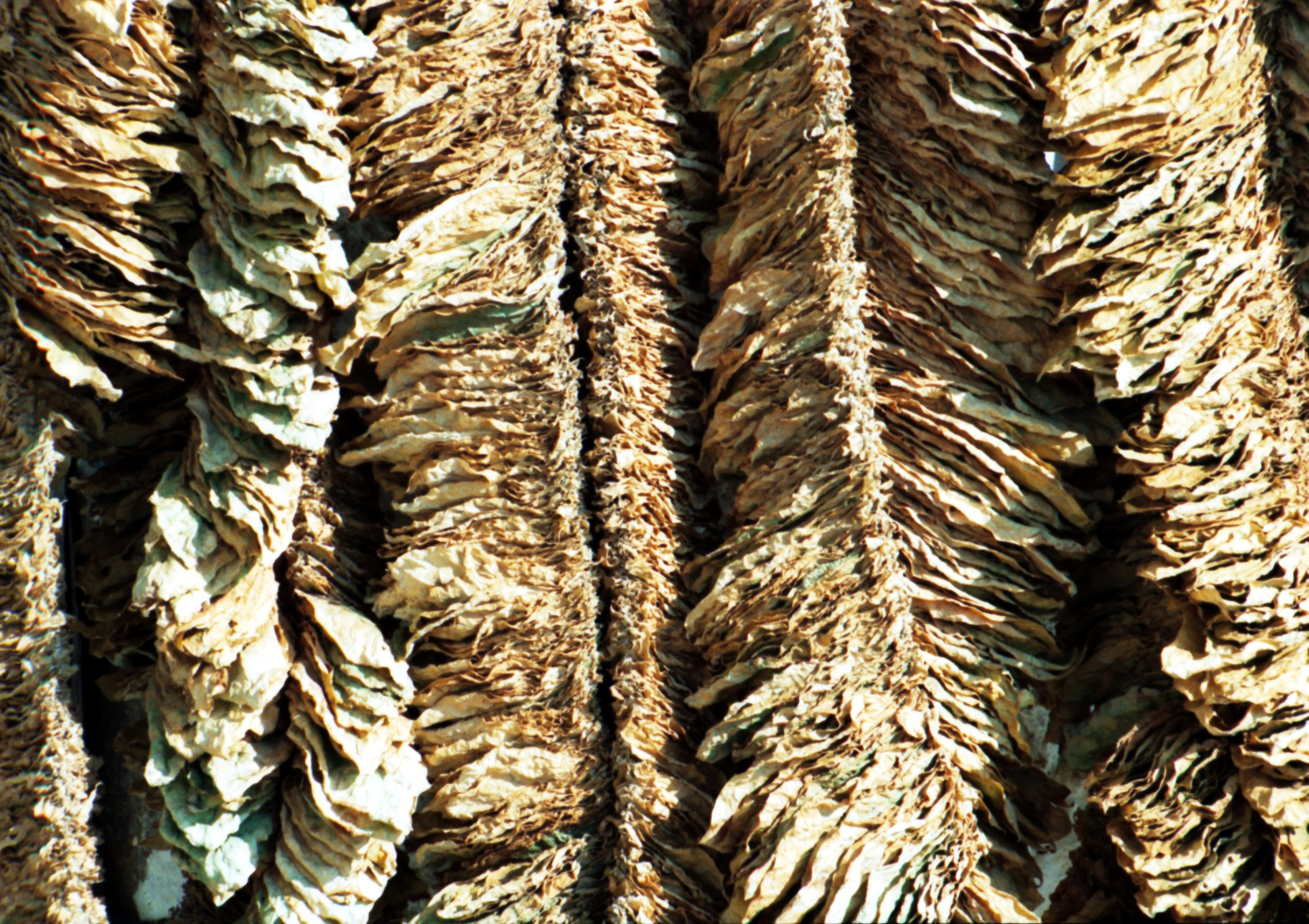
Basma leaves drying in the sun at Pomak village of Xanthi, Greece, 2001

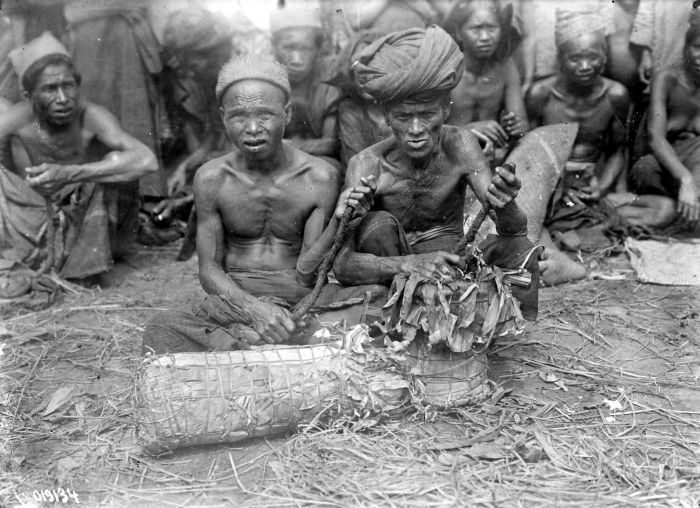
Tobacco harvesters in the Dutch East Indies (modern day Indonesia) around 1920.

Tobacco can be harvested in several ways. In the oldest method, the entire plant is harvested at once by cutting off the stalk at the ground with a sickle. In the nineteenth century, bright tobacco began to be harvested by pulling individual leaves off the stalk as they ripened. As the plants grow, they usually require topping and suckering. "Topping" is the removal of the tobacco flowers while "suckering" is the pruning out of leaves that are otherwise unproductive. Both procedures ensure that as much of the plant's energy as possible focuses on producing the large leaves that are harvested and sold. "Cropping", "Pulling", and "Priming" are terms for removing mature leaves from tobacco plants. Leaves are cropped as they ripen, from the bottom to the top of the stalk.

The first crop of leaves located near the base of the tobacco stalk are called "sand lugs" in more rural southern tobacco states. They are called "sand lugs" because these leaves are close to the ground and get splashed with sand and clay when heavy rains hit the soil. Sand lugs weigh the most, and are most difficult to work with. Their weight is due to their large size and the added weight of soil; slaves lugged each stack to the "stringer" or "looper", typically a female slave, who bundled each stack of leaves. Eventually, workers carried the tobacco and placed it on sleds or trailers.

As the industrial revolution approached America, the harvesting wagons that transported leaves were equipped with man-powered stringers, an apparatus that used twine to attach leaves to a pole. In modern times, large fields are harvested by a single piece of farm equipment, though topping the flower and in some cases the plucking of immature leaves is still done by hand.

Some farmers still use "tobacco harvesters". They are not very efficient yet highly cost-effective for harvesting premium and rare strains of tobacco. Modern harvester trailers for in-demand crops are pulled by diesel-fueled tractors. "Croppers" or "primers" pull the leaves off in handfuls and pass these to the "stringer" or "looper", which bundles the leaves to a four-sided pole with twine. These poles are hung until the harvester is full. The poles are then placed in a much larger wagon to be pulled by diesel tractors to their destination. For rare tobaccos they are often cured on the farm. Traditionally, the slaves who cropped and pulled had a particularly tough time with the first pull of the large, dirty, base leaves. The leaves slapped their faces and dark tobacco sap, which dries into a dark gum, covered their bodies, and then soil stuck to the gum.

The croppers were men, and the stringers, who were seated on the higher elevated seats, were women and children. The harvesters had places for one team of ten workers: eight people cropping and stringing, plus a packer who moved the heavy strung poles of wet green tobacco from the stringers and packed them onto the pallet section of the harvester, plus a horseman. The outer seats were suspended from the harvester - slung out over to fit into the rows of tobacco. As these seats were suspended it was important to balance the weight of the two outside teams (similar to a playground see-saw). Having too heavy or light a person in an unbalanced combination often resulted in the harvester tipping over especially when turning around at the end of a row. Water tanks were a common feature on the harvester due to heat and danger of dehydration.

== Global production ==
=== Trends ===
Production of tobacco leaf increased by 40% between 1971, during which 4.2 million tons of leaf were produced, and 1997, during which 5.9 million tons of leaf were produced. According to the Food and Agriculture organization of the UN, tobacco leaf production is expected to hit 7.1 million tons by 2010. This number is a bit lower than the record high production of 1992, during which 7.5 million tons of leaf were produced. The production growth was almost entirely due to increased productivity by developing nations, where production increased by 128%.

During that same time period, production in developed countries actually decreased. China's increase in tobacco production was the single biggest factor in the increase in world production. China's share of the world market increased from 17% in 1971 to 47% in 1997. This growth can be partially explained by the existence of a high import tariff on foreign tobacco entering China. While this tariff has been reduced from 64% in 1999 to 10% in 2004, it still has led to local, Chinese cigarettes being preferred over foreign cigarettes because of their lower cost.

Every year 6.7 million tons of tobacco are produced throughout the world. The top producers of tobacco are China (39.6%), India (8.3%), Brazil (7.0%) and the United States (4.6%).

=== Major producers ===
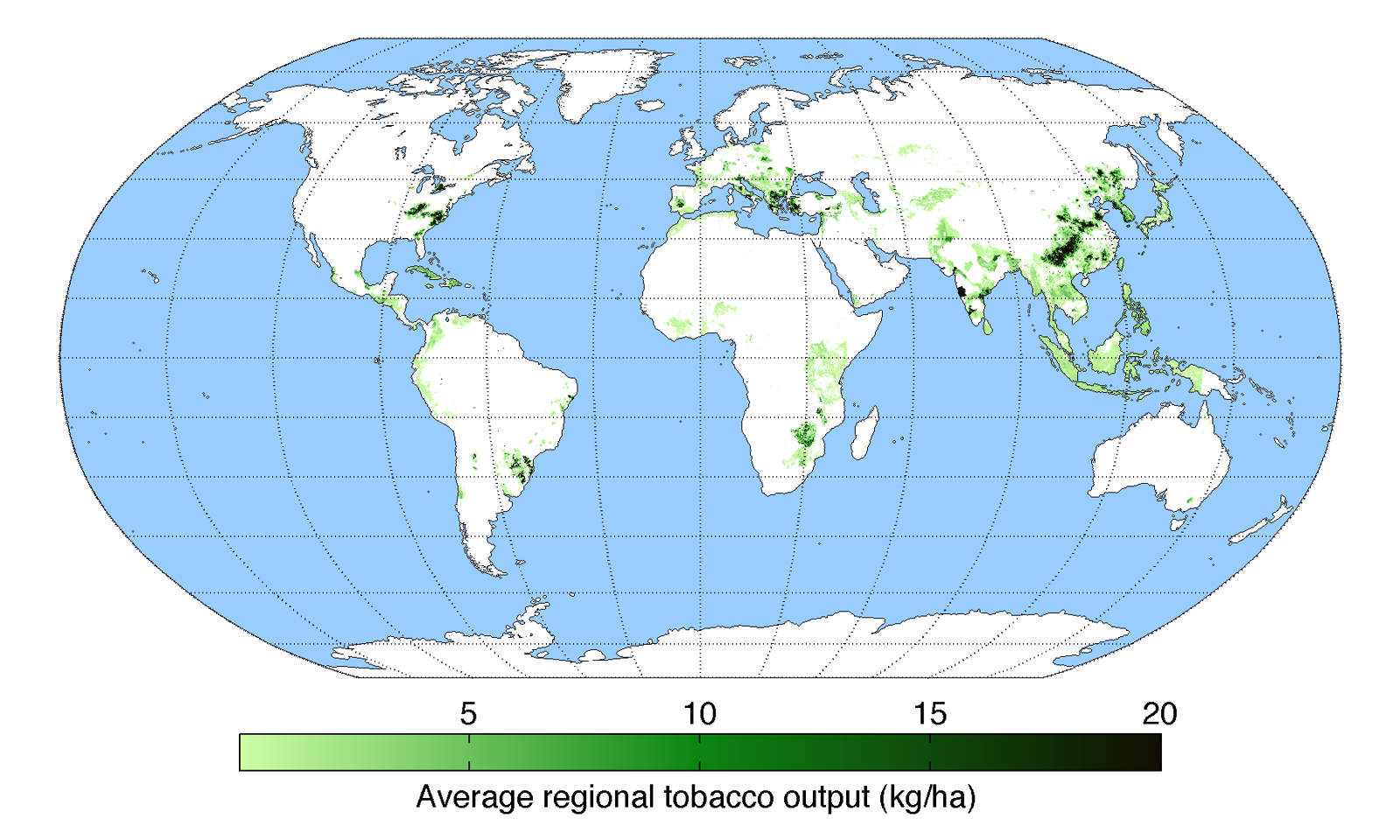
Worldwide tobacco production

==== United States ====
In the United States, as of 2014 North Carolina was the largest producer of tobacco, with around 1,800 tobacco farms employing 30,000 workers yielding in 400 million pounds of the crop annually.

In the US, the decline in the number of smokers, the end of the Tobacco Transition Payment Program in 2014, and competition from growers in other countries, made tobacco farming economics more challenging as of 2015.

==== China ====
At the peak of global tobacco production, there were 20 million rural Chinese households producing tobacco on 2.1 million hectares of land. The vast majority of tobacco production is intended for the national market. While it is the major crop for millions of Chinese farmers, growing tobacco is not as profitable as cotton or sugar cane. This is because the Chinese government sets the market price. While this price is guaranteed, it is lower than the natural market price because of the lack of market risk. To further control tobacco in their borders, China founded the State Tobacco Monopoly Administration (STMA) in 1982. STMA controls tobacco production, marketing, imports, and exports; and contributed 1.3% to national income between 1982 and 2004.

==== Brazil ====
In Brazil around 135,000 family farmers cite tobacco production as their main economic activity. Tobacco has never exceeded 0.7% of the country's total cultivated area. In the southern regions of Brazil, Virginia and Amarelinho flue-cured tobacco as well as Burley and Dark (Galpão Comum) air-cured tobacco are produced. These types of tobacco are used for cigarettes. In the northeast, darker, air-cured and sun-cured tobacco are grown. These types of tobacco are used for cigars, twists and dark-cigarettes. Brazil's government has made attempts to reduce the production of tobacco but has not had a successful systematic anti-tobacco farming initiative. Brazil's government, however, provides small loans for family farms, including those that grow tobacco, through the Programa Nacional de Fortalecimento da Agricultura Familiar (PRONAF).

==== India ====
India has 96,865 registered tobacco farmers and many more who are not registered. Around 0.25% of India's cultivated land is used for tobacco production. The government has set up Tobacco Board Guntur, which works to increase production, sale and exports of Indian tobacco. Guntur is also well known for its tobacco plantations. The Central Tobacco Research Institute works under the aegis of the Indian Council of Agricultural Research. Tobacco crop is cultivated in an area of 0.45 M ha (0.27% of the net cultivated area) producing ≈750 M kg of tobacco leaf. India is the 2nd largest producer and exporter (in quantity terms) after China and Brazil, respectively. The production of Flue-Cured Virginia (FCV) tobacco is about 300 million kg from an area of 0.20 M ha while 450 M kg non-FCV tobacco is produced from an area of 0.25 M ha. In the global scenario, Indian tobacco accounts for 10% of the area and 9% of the total production. By virtue of the dominant role played by this commercial crop, the Indian Central Tobacco Committee (ICTC) established Central Tobacco Research Institute (CTRI) in Rajahmundry (Andhra Pradesh) in 1947. The institute was under the administrative control of ICTC, Madras from 1947 to 1965 and subsequently transferred to the Indian Council of Agricultural Research (ICAR), New Delhi. ICAR acts as a repository of information and provides consultancy on agriculture, horticulture, resource management, animal sciences, agricultural engineering, fisheries, agricultural extension, agricultural education, home science, and agricultural communication. It has the mandate to co-ordinate agricultural research and development programmes and to develop linkages at the national and international levels with related organisations to enhance the quality of life of the farming community.

==== Bangladesh ====
Bangladesh had 84,919 registered tobacco farmers in 2009, which are seen as "first tier" farmers with access to formal contract farming systems. In addition to that, approximately 250,000 unregistered farmers are believed to have tobacco as their main crop. This makes Bangladesh the second largest tobacco producer in terms of workforce, just after China. It is also the third largest in terms of percentage of registered farm land dedicated to tobacco cultivation with 0.4%.

=== Problems in tobacco production ===
==== Child labor ====
The International Labour Office reported that the most child-laborers work in agriculture, which is one of the most hazardous types of work. The tobacco industry houses some of these working children. There is widespread use of children on farms in the United States, Argentina, Brazil, China, India, Indonesia, Malawi and Zimbabwe. While some of these children work with their families on small family-owned farms, others work on large plantations. In late 2009 reports were released by the London-based human-rights group Plan International, claiming that child labor was common on Malawi (producer of 1.8% of the world's tobacco) tobacco farms. The organization interviewed 44 teens, who worked full-time on farms during the 2007-2008 growing season. The child-laborers complained of low pay, long hours as well as physical and sexual abuse by their supervisors. They also reported suffering from green tobacco sickness, a form of nicotine poisoning. When wet leaves are handled, nicotine from the leaves gets absorbed in the skin and causes nausea, vomiting and dizziness. Children were exposed to 50-cigarettes worth of nicotine through direct contact with tobacco leaves. This level of nicotine in children can permanently alter brain structure and function.

In 2014, Human Rights Watch released a report detailing child labor on U.S. tobacco farms. The report states 73% of the children they interviewed reported getting sick with nausea, headaches, respiratory illnesses, and skin conditions, while 66% reported symptoms consistent with acute nicotine poisoning. The report states most children they interviewed worked between 10 and 12 hours per day and some children reported earning less than minimum wage with deductions by the contractor or grower for drinking water or for reasons that were not explained to them. In United States children were found to be working for twelve hours in Tobacco Fields.

In December 2022, the UN special report showed that 3000 children were working in Malawi’s tobacco industry, despite last years’ abolition of an employment system accused of fostering child labor in the tobacco industry. The government of Malawi was implementing programs aimed at ending child labor and ensuring its protection.

==== Economy ====
A large percent of the profits from tobacco production go to large tobacco companies rather than local tobacco farmers. Also many countries have government subsidies for tobacco farming. Major tobacco companies have encouraged global tobacco production. Philip Morris, British American Tobacco and Japan Tobacco each own or lease tobacco manufacturing facilities in at least 50 countries and buy crude tobacco leaf from at least 12 more countries. This encouragement, along with government subsidies has led to a glut in the tobacco market. This surplus has resulted in lower prices, which are devastating to small-scale tobacco farmers. According to the World Bank, between 1985 and 2000 the inflation-adjusted price of tobacco dropped 37%.

==== Environmental impact of tobacco farming ====
Tobacco farming has a significant and detrimental impact on the environment, encompassing various stages from cultivation to consumption and waste disposal.

Deforestation: Tobacco farming is a major driver of deforestation, both for creating plantation space and for obtaining wood used in the energy-intensive curing process. Approximately 5% of global deforestation is attributed to tobacco cultivation. Deforestation leads to climate change, biodiversity loss, soil erosion, and water pollution. One tree is lost for every 300 cigarettes/1.5 cartons produced.

Soil degradation: Tobacco crops deplete soil nutrients more than many other crops, necessitating the heavy use of fertilizers. This contributes to soil erosion and pollution from fertilizer runoff. Some fertilizers used on tobacco crops contain radioactive materials, which can be transferred to smokers' lungs.

Water usage: Tobacco cultivation requires substantial amounts of water, potentially leading to water shortages and impacting water resources.

Pesticide use: Tobacco farming relies heavily on pesticides to combat pests and diseases. Tobacco companies may recommend numerous pesticide applications. Pesticide use contaminates water sources, harms wildlife, and poses health risks to tobacco farmers, who may be unaware of proper safety protocols. Children working on tobacco farms are particularly vulnerable to the harmful effects of pesticides.

Pollution and cigarette butt waste: The manufacturing and consumption of tobacco products contribute to air pollution. Cigarette butts, which are often discarded improperly, are a major source of pollution. These butts are primarily made of cellulose acetate, a plastic that does not readily biodegrade and persists in the environment as microplastic pollution. They leach toxic chemicals, including nicotine and heavy metals, into the environment, harming aquatic life and contaminating soil. The accumulation of cigarette butt waste leads to significant clean-up costs.
