= OceanoScientific =

Programme to study climate change at the ocean-atmosphere interface

The OceanoScientific Programme is a scientific process studying causes and consequences of climate change at the ocean - atmosphere interface.

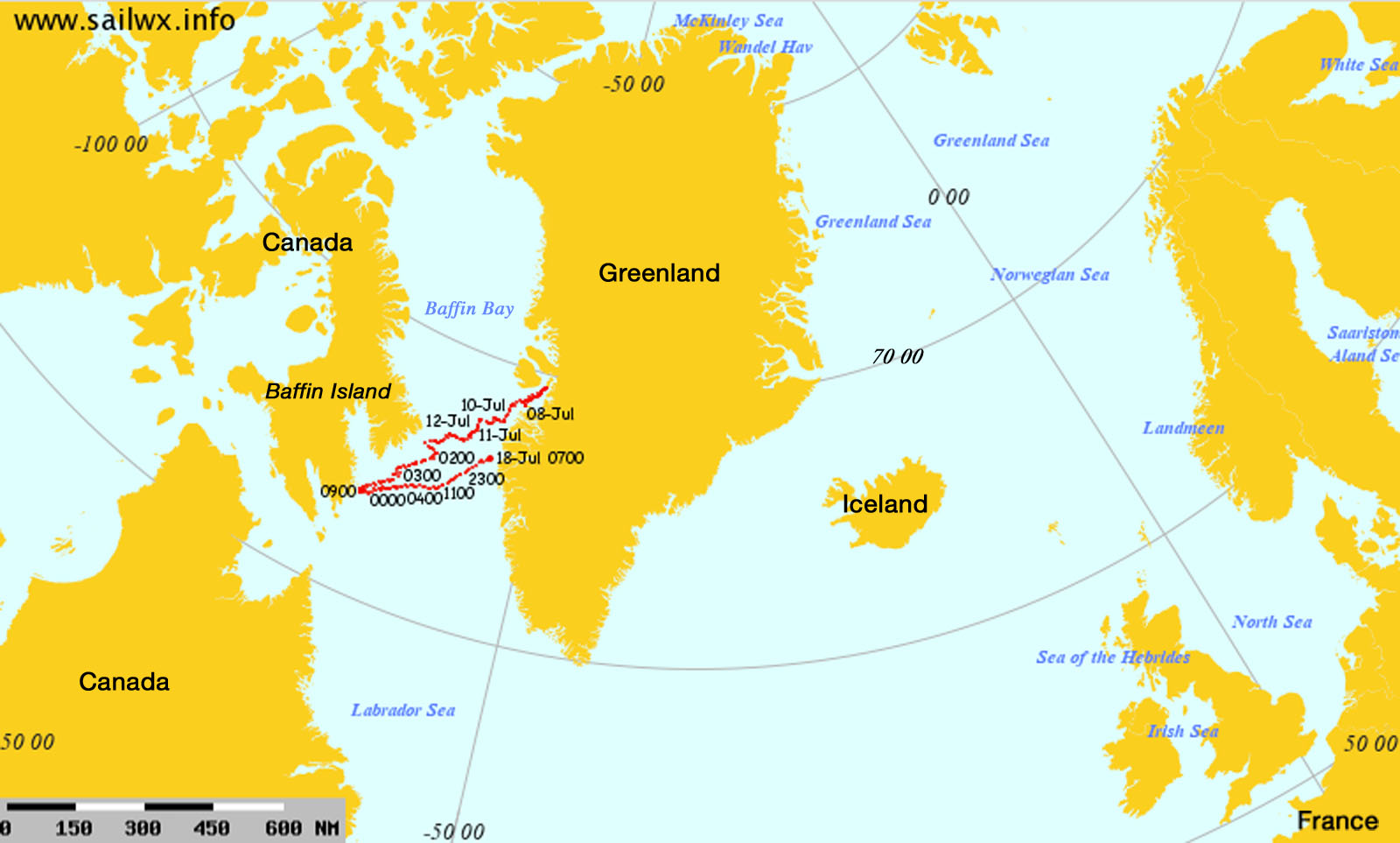
Journey of the schooner La Louise in 2012, equipped with an OSC System collecting data at the ocean - atmosphere interface every six seconds.

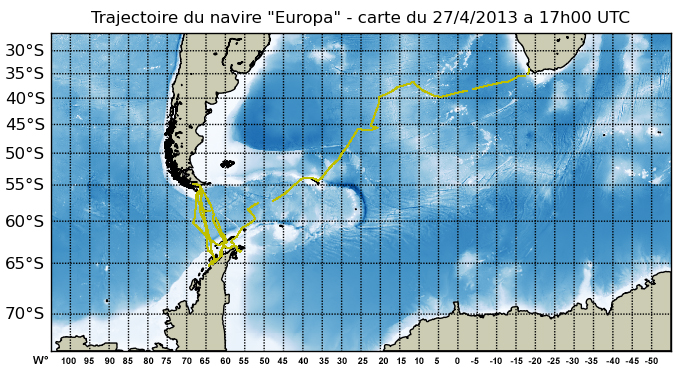
Journey of the three-master Bark EUROPA equipped with an OSC System. Map updated every hour on the website of the Laboratoire de Physique des Océans (LPO - IFREMER).

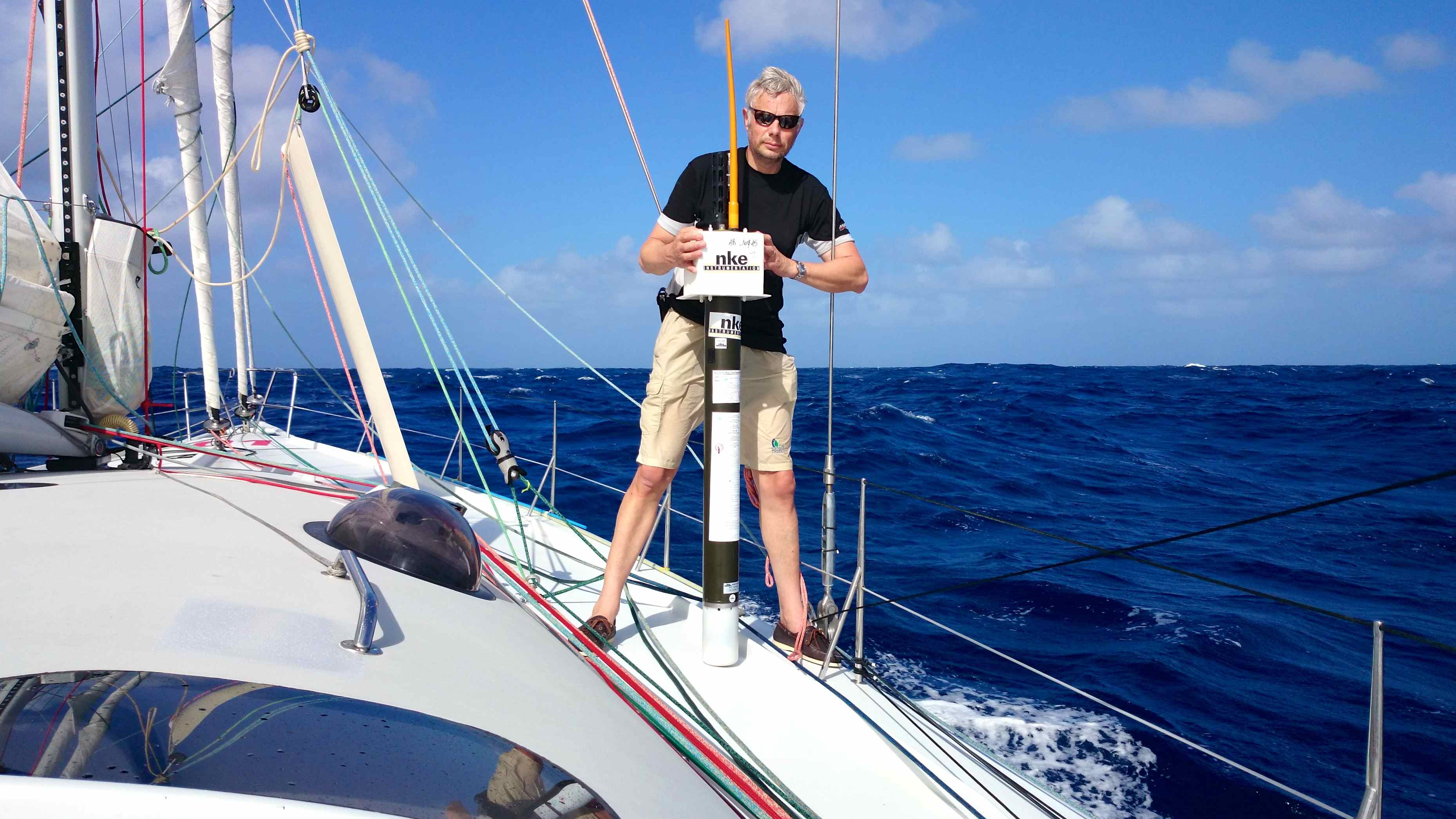
Deployment of scientific material in the North Atlantic - Yvan Griboval - Décembre 2013

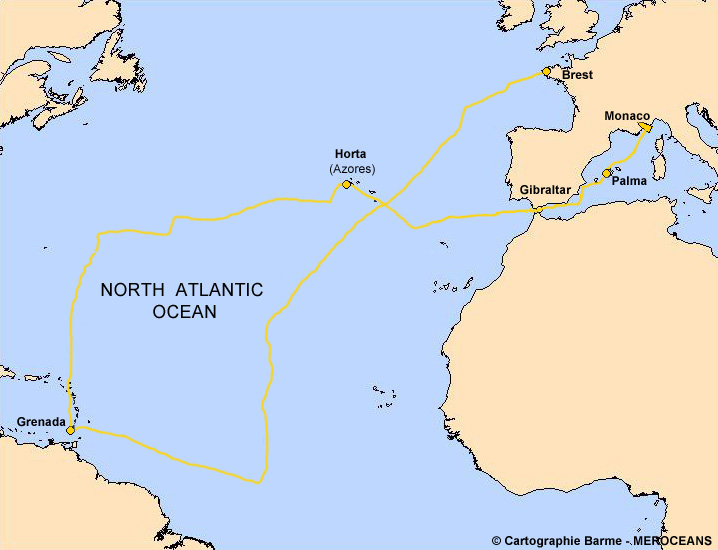
OceanoScientific Campaign 2013-14 - 10 000 nautical miles (18 520 km)

== Sailing dedicated to the Science ==
In November 2006, Yvan Griboval creates the OceanoScientific Programme for SailingOne. The OceanoScientific Programme is the set of activities designed to enable the international scientific community and the IPCC to enrich their knowledge about the causes and consequences of climate change, through the repeated collection of quality data at the ocean - atmosphere interface (oceanographic and atmospheric), especially on sea routes subject to little or no scientific exploration, aboard all kind of vessels but especially sailing ships; guided by JCOMMOPS, the support centre of the Joint WMO - IOC Technical Commission for Oceanography and Marine Meteorology of the United Nations.

IPCC, WMO and IOC are specialized agencies of the United Nations (UN).

The two main contractual partners of the OceanoScientific Programme from the start are the French research institutes IFREMER and Météo-France. The industrial partner of the OceanoScientific Programme is the German company SubCtech, headed and created by Stefan Marx, who created a pCO_{2} sensor. This sensor was compared to others on board the research vessel Polarstern.

== Yvan Griboval - Its creator ==
Self-made man with a scholarship in Rouen (France), Yvan Griboval has early married his passions for sailing and for media, combining the job of professional sportsman, as from 1975 and of journalist-reporter, as from 1979 in French media: L’Équipe, Agence France Presse, Voiles & Voiliers, France Télévision.

Yvan Griboval took part in the win of L’Esprit d’Équipe with Lionel Péan at the Whitbread 1985-86 (now the Volvo Ocean Race), the crewed race around the world.

Then he put his experience and know-how at the service of companies as from 1987 to 1988, to guide them in their event-driven communication processes based on the exploitation of the Yachting in general and the Sailing, of its competitions, of its champions.

Founder and president of the company SailingOne ever since its inception (December 1994), he created the Trophée of Sailing Champions in 1990. As from its first edition, the French version of this event was named the Trophée Clairefontaine thanks to the partnership established in the spring 1990 with the eponymous papermaker group (Groupe des Papeteries de Clairefontaine). In November 2006, Yvan Griboval created the OceanoScientific Programme.

== A unique material (collecting oceanographic and meteorologic data) ==
As from early 2007, Yvan Griboval creates the OceanoScientific System, which is a component of the OceanoScientific Programme and the tool for OceanoScientific Campaigns. This is a "Plug & Play" equipment for the automatic acquisition and transmission by satellite of at least twelve scientific (oceanographic and atmospheric) parameters - formatted according to the standards of UN agencies. The OSC System is a technological development without any equivalent anywhere in the world when it works for the first time, on 14 October 2009. It makes possible for scientists the access to a new fleet of vessels of opportunity: sailing boats especially dedicated to these scientific missions. A scientific publication was carried out after the first test-expedition in the French Revue de l’Electricité et de l’Electronique (REE), in November 2010.

== Data transmission to the International Scientific Community ==
Yvan Griboval initiates then the OceanoScientific Campaigns, standing for the implementation of the OceanoScientific System. It therefore involves the repeated collection of quality data at the ocean - atmosphere interface and their transmission to the oceanography and meteorology international platforms of the specialized agencies of the United Nations (UN). Data of OceanoScientific Campaigns are transmitted free of charge to the international scientific community considering its own criteria. They are integrated into the Global Ocean Observing System (GOOS), for example via WMO's Global Telecommunication System (GTS). These observations contribute to improve meteorological and climatological forecasts in scarcely or not at all scientifically explored ocean areas.

The two first campaigns carried out are: The ARTIC MISSION 2012 on the schooner La Louise in the Baffin Bay between 65° and 70° North; the 96-days ANTARCTIC MISSION 2013, on the three-master Bark EUROPA (Netherlands) between 50° and 63° South, especially in the Drake Passage.

== OceanoScientific Campaign 2013 - 2014 ==
Started from Brest (France) on 28 November 2013, the OceanoScientific Campaign - ATLANTIC MISSION 2013 - 2014, led on the 16-meter Navire A Voile d’Observation Scientifique de l’Environnement (NAVOSE) bearing the colours of the MEROCEANS foundation, came to an end in Monaco on 26 April 2014. In addition to the tests of the OceanoScientific System (OSC System) Version 3.0, a unique material collecting data of ten scientific parameters at the ocean - atmosphere interface, this 10,000 nautical miles (18,520 km) expedition enabled the deployment of drifting scientific materials in compliance with the requirements of JCOMMOPS, a UNESCO agency. In the meantime, the OSC System won the 2013 French-German Prize of Economy in the Environment category. As from now one, the scientific data collected by the OSC System will be transmitted to the CORIOLIS network. This campaign was carried out in energy self-sufficiency, without any CO_{2} emission, thanks to the hydro generators installed on board.

== References of the OceanoScientific Programme ==
Earthzine - Fostering Earth Observation & Global Awareness

ICCIP - International Climate Change Information Programme

Mariners Weather Log - Published by the National Weather Service of the NOAA - April 2014
