= Nicotine poisoning =

- Nicotine
- Specialty: Toxicology, emergency medicine
- Symptoms: Nausea/vomiting, hypersalivation, abdominal pain, pallor, sweating, hypertension, tachycardia, ataxia, tremor, headache, dizziness, fasciculations

Nicotine poisoning describes the symptoms of the toxic effects of nicotine following ingestion, inhalation, or skin contact. Nicotine poisoning can potentially be deadly, though serious or fatal overdoses are rare. Historically, most cases of nicotine poisoning have been the result of use of nicotine as an insecticide. More recent cases of poisoning typically appear to be in the form of Green Tobacco Sickness, or due to unintended ingestion of tobacco or tobacco products or consumption of nicotine-containing plants.

Standard textbooks, databases, and safety sheets consistently state that the lethal dose of nicotine for adults is 60 mg or less (30–60 mg), but there is overwhelming data indicating that more than 500 mg of oral nicotine is required to kill an adult.

Children may become ill following ingestion of one cigarette; ingestion of more than this may cause a child to become severely ill. The nicotine in the e-liquid of an electronic cigarette can be hazardous to infants and children through accidental ingestion or skin contact. In some cases children have become poisoned by topical medicinal creams which contain nicotine.

People who harvest or cultivate tobacco may experience green tobacco sickness (GTS), a type of nicotine poisoning caused by skin contact with wet tobacco leaves. This occurs most commonly in young, inexperienced tobacco harvesters who do not consume tobacco.

== Signs and symptoms ==
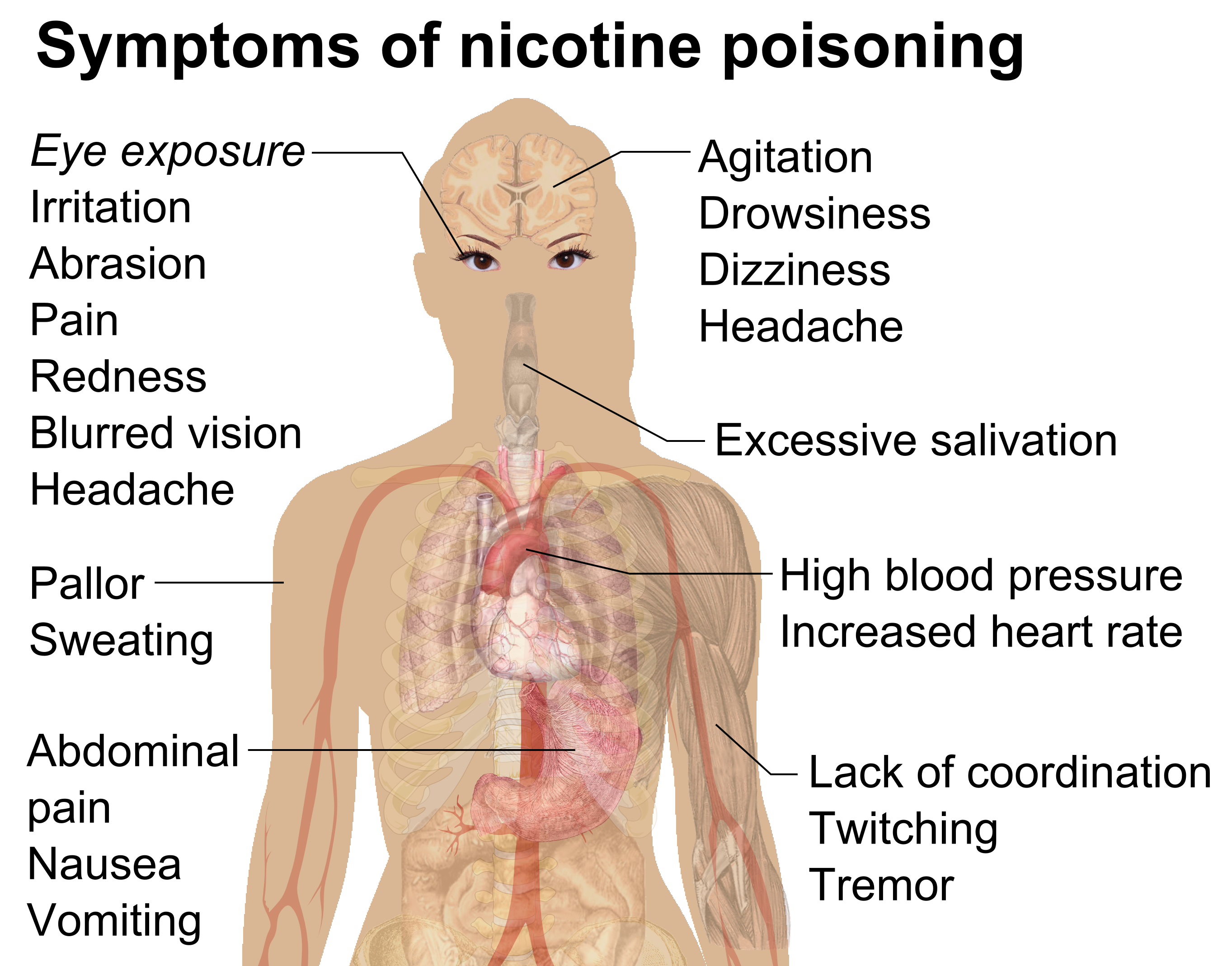
Symptoms of nicotine poisoning related to e-cigarette calls to US poison control centers

Nicotine poisoning tends to produce symptoms that follow a biphasic pattern. The initial symptoms are mainly due to stimulatory effects and include nausea and vomiting, excessive salivation, abdominal pain, pallor, sweating, hypertension, tachycardia, ataxia, tremor, headache, dizziness, muscle fasciculations, and seizures. After the initial stimulatory phase, a later period of depressor effects can occur and may include symptoms of hypotension and bradycardia, central nervous system depression, coma, muscular weakness and/or paralysis, with difficulty breathing or respiratory failure.

From September 1, 2010 to December 31, 2014, there were at least 21,106 traditional cigarette calls to US poison control centers. During the same period, the ten most frequent adverse effects to traditional cigarettes reported to US poison control centers were vomiting (80.0%), nausea (9.2%), drowsiness (7.8%), cough (7.2%), agitation (6.6%), pallor (3.0%), tachycardia (2.5%), diaphoresis (1.5%), dizziness (1.5%), and diarrhea (1.4%). 95% of traditional cigarette calls were related to children 5 years old or less. Most of the traditional cigarette calls were a minor effect.

Calls to US poison control centers related to e-cigarette exposures involved inhalations, eye exposures, skin exposures, and ingestion, in both adults and young children. Minor, moderate, and serious adverse effects involved adults and young children. Minor effects correlated with e-cigarette liquid poisoning were tachycardia, tremor, chest pain and hypertension. More serious effects were bradycardia, hypotension, nausea, respiratory paralysis, atrial fibrillation and dyspnea. The exact correlation is not fully known between these effects and e-cigarettes. 58% of e-cigarette calls to US poison control centers were related to children 5 years old or less. E-cigarette calls had a greater chance to report an adverse effect and a greater chance to report a moderate or major adverse effect than traditional cigarette calls. Most of the e-cigarette calls were a minor effect.

From September 1, 2010 to December 31, 2014, there were at least 5,970 e-cigarette calls to US poison control centers. During the same period, the ten most frequent adverse effects to e-cigarettes and e-liquid reported to US poison control centers were vomiting (40.4%), eye irritation or pain (20.3%), nausea (16.8%), red eye or conjunctivitis (10.5%), dizziness (7.5%), tachycardia (7.1%), drowsiness (7.1%), agitation (6.3%), headache (4.8%), and cough (4.5%).

E-cigarette exposure cases in the US National Poison Data System increased greatly between 2010 and 2014, peaking at 3,742 in 2014, fell in 2015 though 2017, and then between 2017 and 2018 e-cigarette exposure cases increased from 2,320 to 2,901. The majority of cases (65%) were in children under age five and 15% were in ages 5–24. Approximately 0.1% of cases developed life-threatening symptoms.

== Toxicology ==
The LD_{50} of nicotine is 50 mg/kg for rats and 3 mg/kg for mice. 0.5–1.0 mg/kg can be a lethal dosage for adult humans, and 0.1 mg/kg for children. However the widely used human LD_{50} estimate of 0.5–1.0 mg/kg was questioned in a 2013 review, in light of several documented cases of humans surviving much higher doses; the 2013 review suggests that the lower limit causing fatal outcomes is 500–1000 mg of ingested nicotine, corresponding to 6.5–13 mg/kg orally. An accidental ingestion of only 6 mg may be lethal to children.

It is unlikely that a person would overdose on nicotine through smoking alone. The US Food and Drug Administration (FDA) stated in 2013: "There are no significant safety concerns associated with using more than one [over the counter] OTC [nicotine replacement therapy] NRT at the same time, or using an OTC NRT at the same time as another nicotine-containing product—including a cigarette." Ingestion of nicotine pharmaceuticals, tobacco products, or nicotine containing plants may also lead to poisoning. Smoking excessive amounts of tobacco has also led to poisoning; a case was reported where two brothers smoked 17 or 18 pipes of tobacco in succession and were both fatally poisoned. Spilling an extremely high concentration of nicotine onto the skin can result in intoxication or even death since nicotine readily passes into the bloodstream following skin contact.

The recent rise in the use of electronic cigarettes, many forms of which are designed to be refilled with nicotine-containing "e-liquid" supplied in small plastic bottles, has renewed interest in nicotine overdoses, especially the possibility of young children ingesting the liquids. A 2015 Public Health England report noted an "unconfirmed newspaper report of a fatal poisoning of a two-year old child" and two published case reports of children of similar age who had recovered after ingesting e-liquid and vomiting. They also noted case reports of suicides by nicotine, where adults drank liquid containing up to 1,500 mg of nicotine. They recovered (helped by vomiting), but an ingestion apparently of about 10,000 mg was fatal, as was an injection. They commented that "Serious nicotine poisoning seems normally prevented by the fact that relatively low doses of nicotine cause nausea and vomiting, which stops users from further intake." Four adults died in the US and Europe, after intentionally ingesting liquid. Two children, one in the US in 2014 and another in Israel in 2013, died after ingesting liquid nicotine.

The discrepancy between the historically stated 60-mg dose and published cases of nicotine intoxication has been noted previously (Matsushima et al. 1995; Metzler et al. 2005). Nonetheless, this value is still widely accepted over the 500 mg figure as the basis for safety regulations of tobacco and other nicotine-containing products (such as the EU wide TPD, set at a maximum of 20 mg/ml).

== Pathophysiology ==
The symptoms of nicotine poisoning are caused by effects at nicotinic cholinergic receptors. Nicotine is an agonist at nicotinic acetylcholine receptor which are present in the central and autonomic nervous systems, and the neuromuscular junction. At low doses nicotine causes stimulatory effects on these receptors, however, higher doses or more sustained exposures can cause inhibitory effects leading to neuromuscular blockade.

It is sometimes reported that people poisoned by organophosphate insecticides experience the same symptoms as nicotine poisoning. Organophosphates inhibit the enzyme acetylcholinesterase, causing a buildup of acetylcholine, excessive stimulation of all types of cholinergic neurons, and a wide range of symptoms. Nicotine is specific for nicotinic cholinergic receptors only and has some, but not all of the symptoms of organophosphate poisoning.

== Diagnosis ==
Increased nicotine or cotinine (the nicotine metabolite) is detected in urine or blood, or serum nicotine concentrations increase.

== Treatment ==
The initial treatment of nicotine poisoning may include the administration of activated charcoal to try to reduce gastrointestinal absorption. Treatment is mainly supportive and further care can include control of seizures with the administration of a benzodiazepine, intravenous fluids for hypotension, and administration of atropine for bradycardia. Respiratory failure may necessitate respiratory support with rapid sequence induction and mechanical ventilation. Hemodialysis, hemoperfusion or other extracorporeal techniques do not remove nicotine from the blood and are therefore not useful in enhancing elimination. Acidifying the urine could theoretically enhance nicotine excretion, although this is not recommended as it may cause complications of metabolic acidosis.

== Prognosis ==
The prognosis is typically good when medical care is provided and patients adequately treated are unlikely to have any long-term sequelae. However, severely affected patients with prolonged seizures or respiratory failure may have ongoing impairments secondary to the hypoxia. It has been stated that if a patient survives nicotine poisoning during the first 4 hours, they usually recover completely. At least at "normal" levels, as nicotine in the human body is broken down, it has an approximate biological half-life of 1–2 hours. Cotinine is an active metabolite of nicotine that remains in the blood for 18–20 hours, making it easier to analyze due to its longer half-life.

== See also ==
- Health effects of tobacco
- Nicotine dependence
- Nicotine withdrawal
