= Yvan Griboval =

Yvan Griboval (born 7 January 1957 in Mont-Saint-Aignan, near Rouen in the French Department Seine-Maritime), is the son of Cécile Griboval born Toutain (1924-2012) and Roger Griboval (1908-1997). Roger Griboval was an impressionist painter from the Ecole de Rouen, renowned for his talent as an aquarellist. Only child, Yvan Griboval discovered the nature accompanying his father painting en plein-air: Higher-Normandy coast (from Dieppe to Fécamp) and at the edge of the Seine around Rouen. He spent all his weekends and holidays in Saint-Valéry-en-Caux, where he was taught very young to fish on the sea, and above all to discover the marine environment and to the sailing competition on Requin.

== Career ==
A self-described self-made man, Griboval pursued parallel careers in professional sailing and journalism from an early age. Beginning in 1975, he competed in regattas and offshore racing, while from 1979 he worked as a journalist and photographer across print and television media, contributing to outlets including L'Équipe, Agence France-Presse, Voiles & Voiliers, and France Télévisions. Over the course of his media career, he held roles as reporter, editor-in-chief, editor, presenter, director, and producer.

=== Sailing ===
Yvan Griboval has worked as a "factory skipper" at the beginning of the 80’s for the Chantiers Bénéteau and sometimes also for the chantiers Jeanneau and Kirié, for which he won many classical French races: Semaine de La Rochelle, Semaine de Marseille, Course Croisière Edhec, etc. Yvan Griboval has run several transatlantic races for the Chantiers Bénéteau: Twostar on First, La Rochelle - La Nouvelle Orléans on Maison Phénix, Transat en Double on Maison Phénix III, where he finished second or third in his class. Running in the Route du Rhum 82 on Maison Phénix II, again on a sailing ship Bénéteau, he has to give up because of a breakdown of autopilot.

=== Whitbread 1985-86 ===
Yvan Griboval took part in the win of L’Esprit d’Équipe with Lionel Péan in the Whitbread 1985-86 (now the Volvo Ocean Race), the crewed race around the world. This French win in 1986 has only been renewed in 2012 (Franck Cammas and his crew on Groupama).

=== The watershed to communication ===
Yvan Griboval has then put his experience and know-how at the service of companies as from 1987 to 1988, to guide them in their event-driven communication processes based on the exploitation of the Yachting in general and the Sailing, of its competitions, of its champions.

=== Pioneering concepts ===
Within this framework, Yvan Griboval developed media coverage methods for the events in which he was involved, working with partners in the field of competitive sailing. His activities included events such as the America’s Cup, the Volvo Ocean Race, transatlantic races, world championships and the Tour de France à la Voile.

=== SailingOne ===
Yvan Griboval is the founder and president of the company SailingOne (SAS) ever since its inception (December 1994) after the takeover of the company KL Organisation, in whose creation he was involved in 1990, before purchasing it in December 1992, and then transforming it.

== Trophée des Champions ==
=== Twenty-three years of partnership ===
Yvan Griboval has created the Trophée of Sailing Champions in 1990 on the request of Pierre and Antoine Legris for Chantier KL Nautique. As from its first edition, the French version of this event was named the Trophée Clairefontaine thanks to the partnership established in the spring 1990 with the eponymous papermaker group (Groupe des Papeteries de Clairefontaine). This event is run every year, in mid-September. Created in La Trinité-sur-Mer, the Trophée Clairefontaine has also been organised in Cap d’Agde, in Valencia (Spain) and in La Grande Motte. Other Trophée des Champions have been organised in Marseille, Cadiz (Spain) and Beyrouth (Lebanon). The Trophée des Champions is a brand filed by SailingOne, registered at the French National Industrial Property Institute (INPI). All rights are reserved. SailingOne exclusively manages these rights.

=== An unprecedented concept ===
The four key point of the Trophée des Champions are:

1. Bringing together great sailing champions from different international sailing disciplines;
2. Providing them with exactly the same equipment specially designed and exclusively used for this event, the SailingOne 25 one-design catamaran imagined by Yvan Griboval, designed by Cabinet Van Peteghem - Lauriot-Prévost and implemented by Patrick Tabarly and Serge Madec;
3. Carrying out very short competitions (8 to 10 min) with specific and unique rules, in front of the public, making it a show free of charge and easy to understand for all;
4. Staging these competitions in order to make the show easy to use for media.

Yvan Griboval is renowned as one of the first founders and producers of sailing-show events (as from 1990) transforming this sport with competitions sometimes abstruse in real sailing shows, without making the sportive aspect weaker, quite the opposite. His innovations have been taken over with success by many organisers to create different circuits for multihulls: D35 Championship on the Leman Lake, Extreme Series and AC45 World Series in the whole world, etc.

== OceanoScientific Programme ==
In November 2006, Yvan Griboval creates the OceanoScientific Programme for SailingOne. The OceanoScientific Programme is the set if activities designed to enable the international scientific community and the IPCC* to enrich their knowledge about the causes and consequences of climate change, through the repeated collection of quality data at the ocean - atmosphere interface (oceanographic and atmospheric), especially on sea routes subject to little or no scientific exploration, aboard all kind of vessels but especially sailing ships; guided by JCOMM, the Joint WMO** - IOC*** Technical Commission for Oceanography and Marine Meteorology of the UN. OceanoScientific is a brand filed by SailingOne, registered at the French National Industrial Property Institute (INPI). All rights are reserved. SailingOne exclusively manages these rights.

- Intergovernmental Panel on Climate Change (IPCC)
  - World Meteorological Organization (WMO)
    - Intergovernmental Oceanographic Commission of UNESCO (IOC - UNESCO)

IPCC, WMO and IOC are specialized agencies of the United Nations (UN)

Other references au Programme OceanoScientific
