= Vespa GTS =

Piaggio Vespa Granturismo
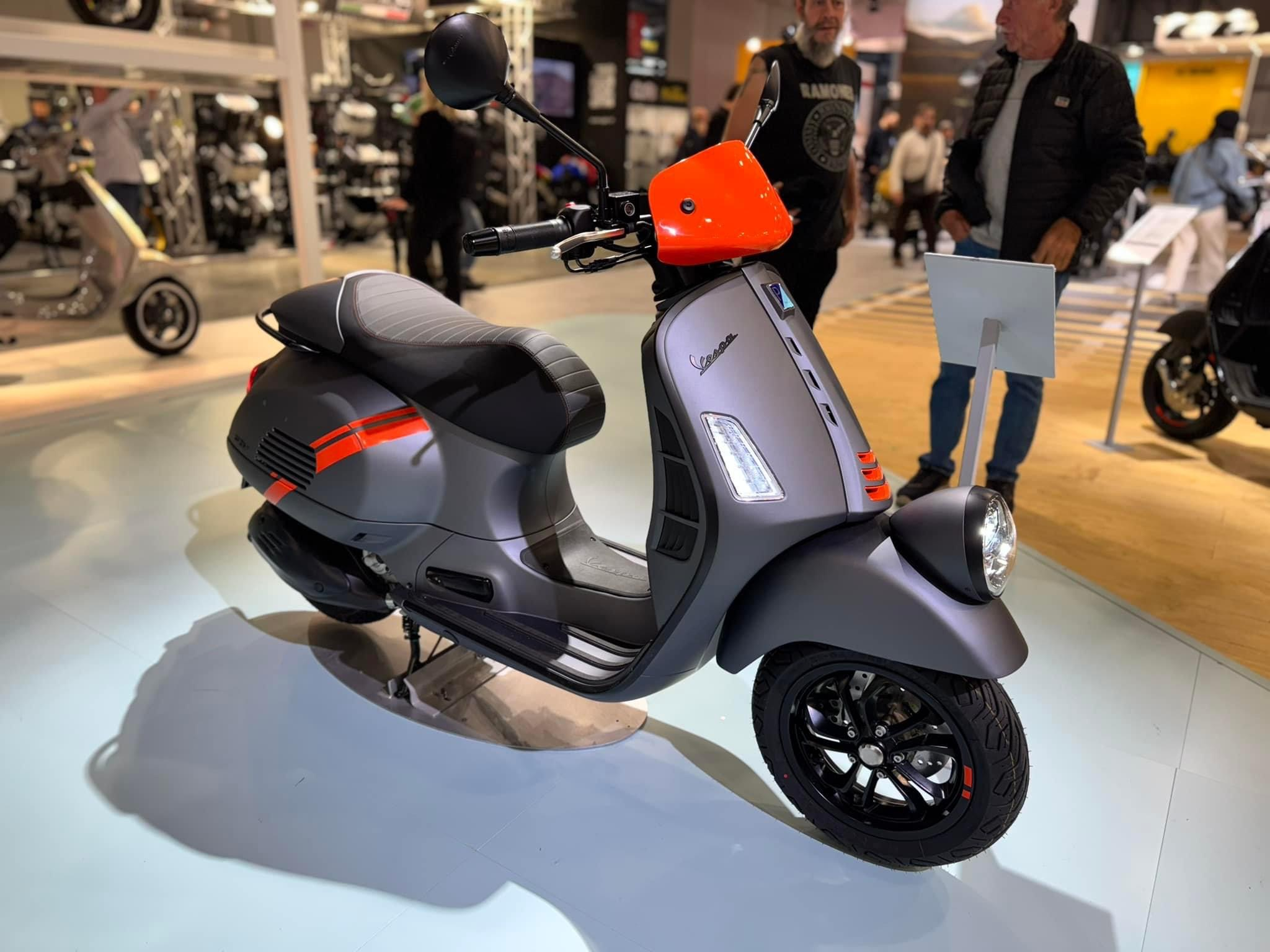
- Vespa GTV 310 At Eicma show, Milan 2025
- Manufacturer: Piaggio
- Also called: Piaggio Vespa GTL; Piaggio Vespa GTS; Piaggio Vespa GTV; Piaggio Vespa 60
- Production: 2003–present (Europe); 2003-present (Asia)
- Assembly: Italy: Pontedera; India: Baramati; Vietnam: Vĩnh Phúc
- Class: Scooter
- Transmission: CVT

The Vespa Granturismo is a range of large-frame motor scooters manufactured by Piaggio beginning in 2003. The range grew with the addition of GTV and GTS models, with the largest Vespa engine scooter being a 310cc model introduced in 2025.

== Introduction ==
The GTL (Gran Turismo Liquido) was Presented at the Milan Show by Giancarlo Binetti, Senior Vice President on 25 March 2003 in 125 and 200cc models - at that time the largest and most powerful Vespa model.

In late 2005 for the 2006 model year, the GTS250 (Gran Turismo Sport) was released. Europe was the first to see availability, with units arriving in the US in early 2006. The introduction of the GTS 250 represented the first time fuel injection had ever been included on a Vespa. This, along with a larger engine (vs. the GT200) and improved handling, made the GTS 250 easily the most capable Vespa ever made up to that date. In terms of design and engineering, the GTS has virtually the same metal frame as the GT, but with an uprated engine, differing plastic bodywork, seat, and a new electronic instrument cluster.

In 2006 based on the GTS250; the GTV line was presented to celebrate Vespa's 60th anniversary with features including the headlight being installed on the front fender and handlebars and seats inspired by 1950s Vespas. At the same show the limited-edition Vespa GT 60°was introduced with exclusive colour schemes and limited to 999 models.

In 2007 the GTS125 model was introduced as a replacement for the GT125l.

Launched in 2008 With an ultra-modern, powerful 4-valve liquid-cooled engine, electronic injection and Euro3 approval, the Vespa GTS 300 Super at 278cc was released with the largest displacement engine fitted to a Vespa.

in November 2024 the GTS 310 heralded the arrival of a new 310 cc engine, which replaces the old 278 cc version with 25 hp.

In June 2009, production also started in Vietnam at the Binh Xuyen Indus plant of the local subsidiary Piaggio Vietnam Ltd. These models are sold on Asian markets.

== Vespa GTL ==
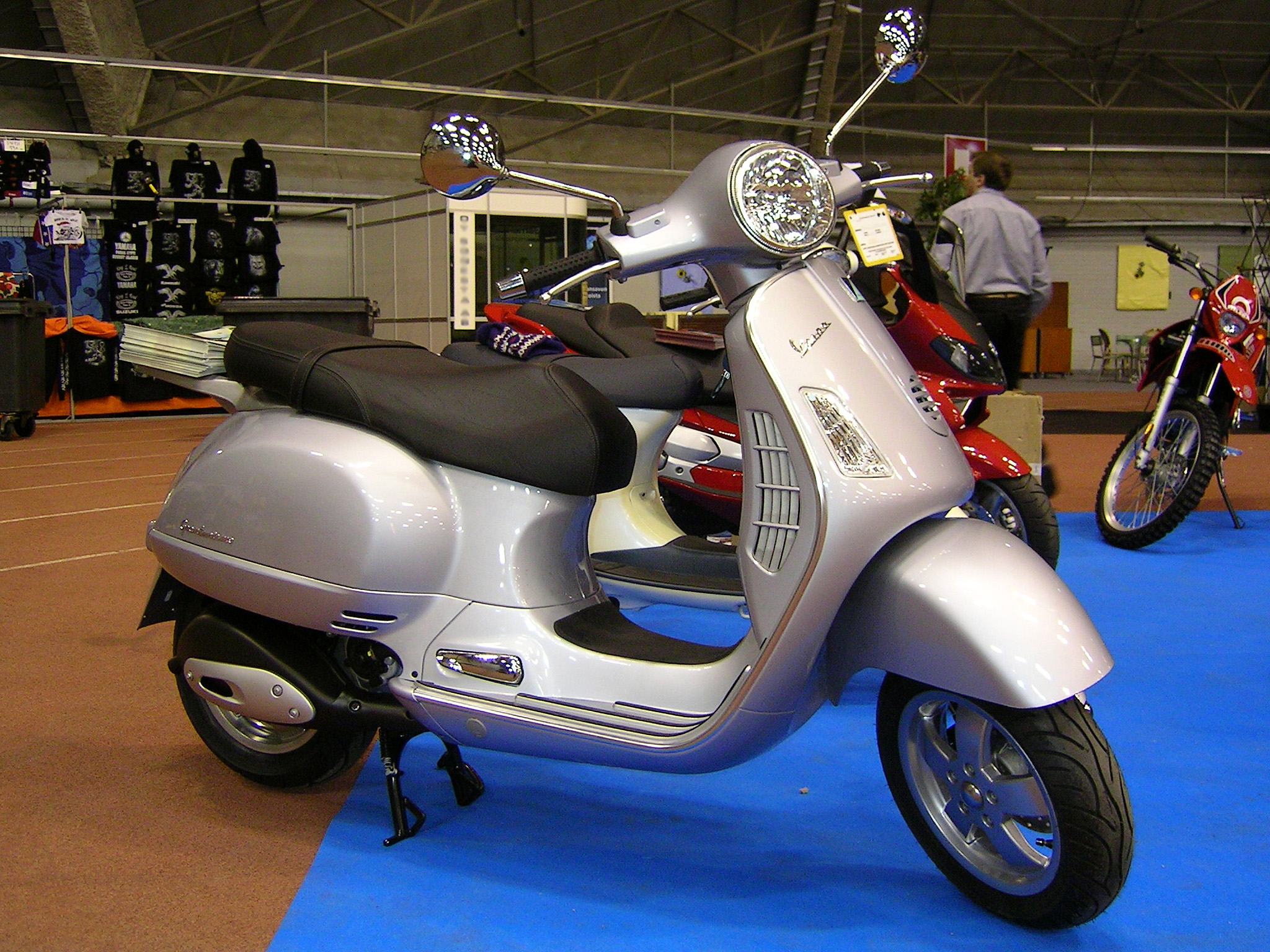
Vespa GT 200 Granturismo

The GTL (Gran Turismo Liquido) 125 and 200 were presented at the Milan Show by Giancarlo Binetti, Senior Vice President on 25 March 2003 in 125 and 200cc models - at that time the largest and most powerful vespa model.The 2003 Vespa Granturismo 200L and 125L were the first-ever Vespa to have four-stroke, four-valve, liquid-cooled engines that met the 2003 Euro 2 emissions standards.they also featured an automatic torque slave transmission and front disc and rear drum brakes.The GT200 used a carbureted LEADER engine, increased from 150cc (ET-4) to 198 cc, and installed into a larger frame. Other upgrades include 12" wheels, 2 wheel disc brakes, and liquid cooling.

== Vespa GTS ==
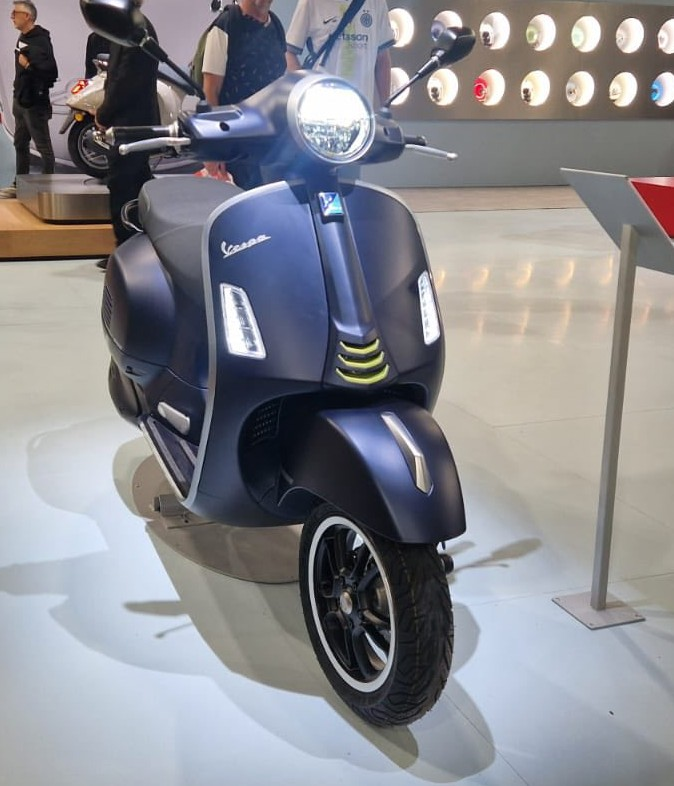
Vespa GTS 310

In late 2005 for the 2006 model year, the GTS250 (Gran Turismo Sport) was released . Europe was the first to see availability, with units arriving in the US in early 2006. The introduction of the GTS 250 represented the first time fuel injection had ever been included on a Vespa. This, along with a larger engine (vs. the GT200) and improved handling, made the GTS 250 easily the most capable Vespa ever made up to that date.In terms of design and engineering, the GTS has virtually the same metal frame as the GT, but with an uprated engine, differing plastic bodywork, seat, and a new electronic instrument cluster. .

In 2007 the GTS125 model was introduced as a replacement for the GT125l.

Launched in 2008 With an ultra-modern, powerful 4-valve liquid-cooled engine, electronic injection and Euro3 approval, the Vespa GTS 300 Super at 278cc was released with the largest displacement engine fitted to a Vespa.

in November 2024 the GTS 310 heralded the arrival of a new 310 cc engine, which replaces the old 278 cc version with 25 hp.

== Vespa GTV ==
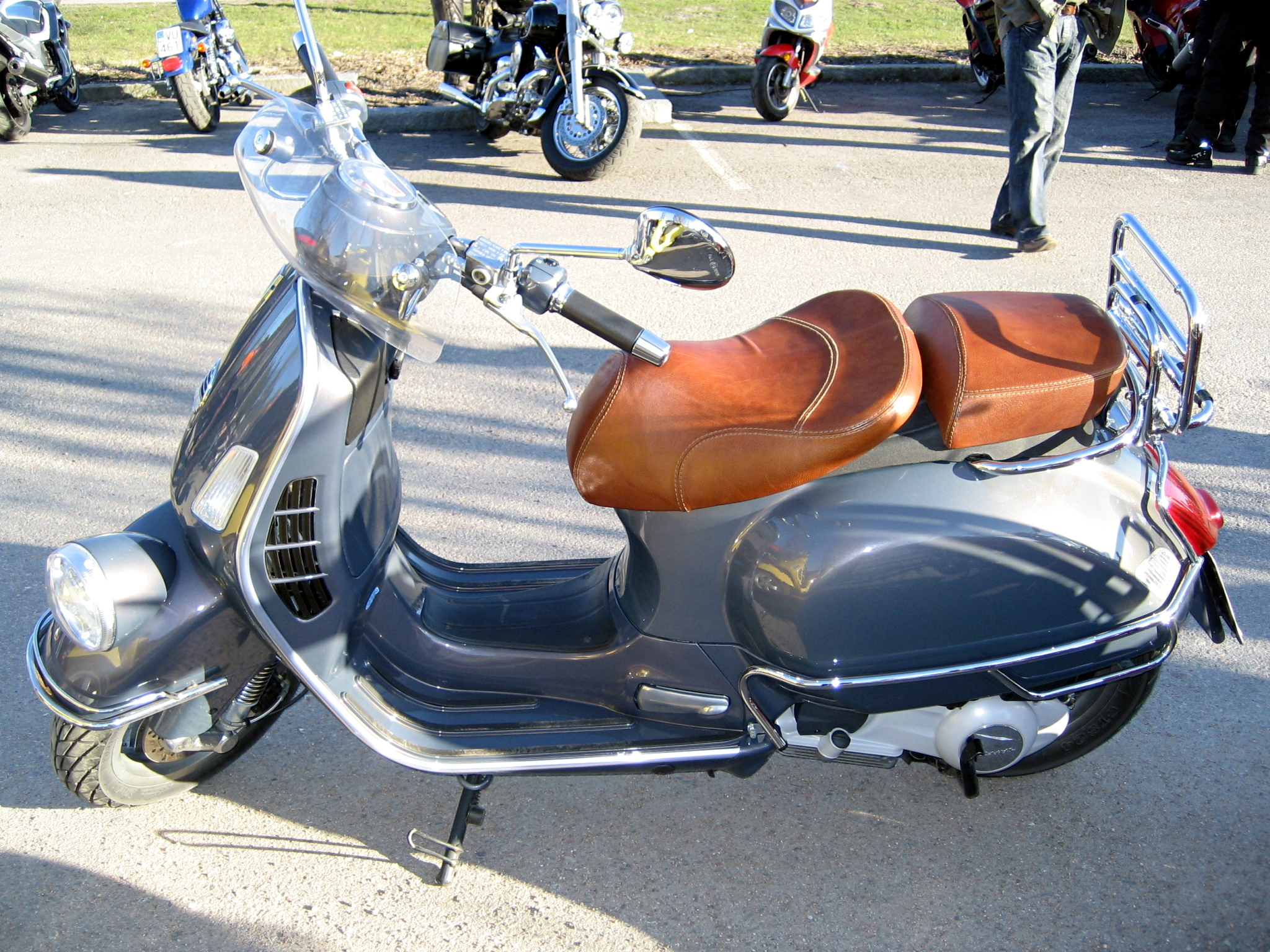
Vespa GTV 250ie

Mechanically based on the GTS 250 with a reinterpretation of the most distinctive elements of 50s and 60s styling, the Gran Turismo Vintage 250 was released in 2006 to celebrate the 60th anniversary of the Vespa, It's features including the headlight being installed on the front fender and handlebars and seats inspired by 1950's vespas.

== Vespa 60° ==
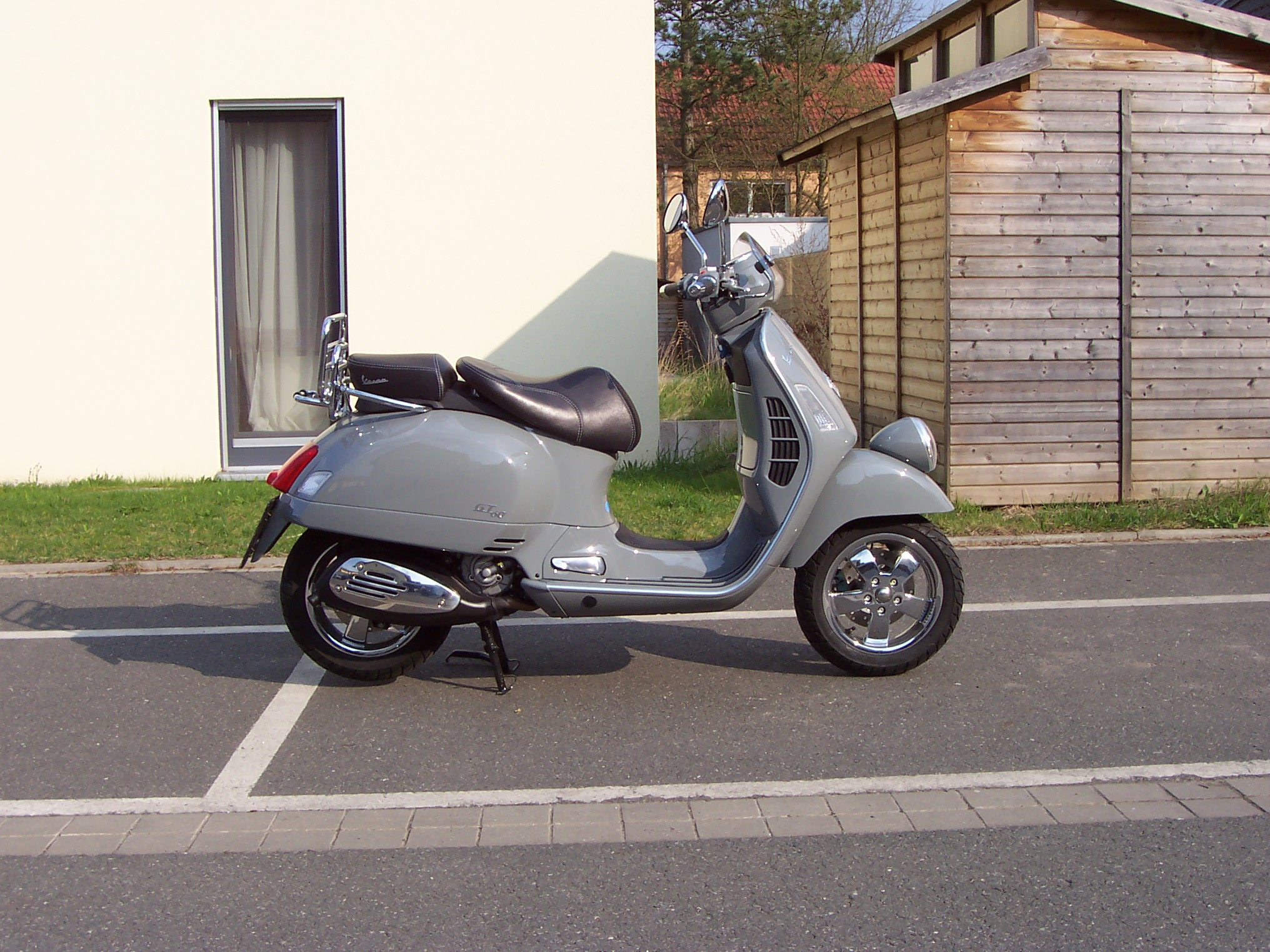
Vespa GT60 250 Scooter

Released in 2006 to celebrate the 60th anniversary of the Vespa, the GT60 was issued in a limited edition of 999 pieces. Based on the GTS 250 with a reinterpretation of the most distinctive elements of 50s and 60s styling in form and function It was only available in a unique shade of gray (color code 786/A), which corresponded to the first prototypes. The buyer also received a leather box with the a numbered plaque with the initials of the buyer to mount on the scooter, an additional silver plaque, a special edition of the book of the Vespa, Italian style for the world, a keychain made of leather, document bag made of leather, a satin-finished cover, a hand-signed sketch of the Vespa GT60 and a comprehensive brochure.

== Special models ==
=== GTS Super Sport ===
The models in the Super Sport series sport seat, and partly a matte finish. The vehicles are Vespa GTS 125 i. e. (i get), Super sports, and as the Vespa GTS 300 i. e. (HPE) super .

=== GTS Touring ===
In this special model from 2016 is a Vespa GTS, which was upgraded with the front and rear Luggage racks are also available as accessories for purchase. In addition, all models in exclusive colors such as dolomite, gray, or maroon. Initially, only as a Vespa GTS 300 i. e. Touring, it is from 2016, also a Vespa GTS 125 i. e. Touring.

=== Settantesimo ===
issued in celebration of the 70th Birthday of the Vespa brand in 2016, the special model Vespa GTS Settantesimo presented, whose outstanding feature is the turquoise-blue color. Settantesimo is Italian and means Seventieth or Seventies, what is a in Italy, the common abbreviation for the 70. A birthday is. Technically, this is a GTS 300, or a GTS 125, with accessories such as a Luggage carrier, as well as a leather saddle with embossed number 70 upgraded was.

=== Sei Giorni ===
300 units were released in 2017 of the modern version of the legendary Sei Giorni Vespa entered in the "International di Varese", where in 1951, nine gold medals were won. The "Faro Basso", the headlight on the front fender and the handlebar are the style elements that should remind you of the historical "Sei Giorni". The black number plates with white "Six" are a throwback to the successful competition models. The "Sei Giorni" is, among other things, with a seat in the Single-Seat Look, 2-channel ABS and LED daytime running lights fitted. Depending on the model year, these special models with different colors will be delivered In 2019 a second series was introduced again in a limited run of 300 units

=== 75th Anniversary ===
Presented in March 2021 and launched on the market in April, this model celebrates the 75th anniversary of the Vespa and stands out for its brand-new 75th Yellow metallic colour, specific saddle with piping, gray painted rims with diamond-cut edges and chrome details as well as accessories.

=== 80th Anniversary ===
Presented in November 2025 at EICMA and on the market in June 2026 (preorders from March) to coincide with the Vespa World Day celebration in Rome of the 80th Anniversary of the first Vespa. 300cc GTS stands out with its Verde Pastello Livery and bespoke badging.

=== Officina 8 ===
Released in June 2025 for the GTS 300 HPE & 310cc models in celebration of the original post-war "Workshop 8" inside Piaggio's Pontedera factory each model gets matte Blu Officina 8 livery, satin metal details in aluminium and brass, diamond-cut wheels, and bespoke badging inspired by the pins worn by Piaggio's original development team.

=== VESPA 140th of Piaggio ===
in celebration of the 140th anniversary of the founding of Piaggio in 1884 a special version of the GTV 300 HPE in a livery of blue and light blue on a white body, the Piaggio Group's institutional colours, which interact with the classic graphics and the new Vespa monogram, as well as the celebratory 140-years logo. These colours also enhance the classic necktie on the front shield, the distinctive mark of every Vespa, designed with triple air intakes on both sides and central grilles. The front fairing is also reminiscent of the racing spirit which inspires the GTV.The seat is blue, with double tone-on-tone stitching and in contrast, it is characterised by the unmistakeable single-seater look, with a wide and comfortable saddle. The rear saddle cover comes standard, another nod to Vespa's elegantly sporty soul.The wheel rims, blue with light blue inserts, are also dedicated to this model. The aesthetics of the new Vespa 140th of Piaggio are completed by the black finishes of the body profiles, the mirrors, the silencer, and the fold-away passenger footrests. these limited units were only sold 18/4/2024-21/4/2024

=== Racing Sixties ===
Introduced in 2019 this series's lvery was inspired by the 1960s which were a legendary period in the history of racing and motoring. In addition to the new colour scheme, a brand-new seat and matte black details, matte black finish of the passenger grab handle and footrests, the front and rear light setting, the silencer cover, the rear-view mirrors, the onboard instrument cluster base and shield trim, as well as the crest on the front mudguard of the Vespa GTS Super "Racing Sixties".

=== Notte ===
Released as a single model GTS 300 release, the notte (or night) was characterized by total black graphics. The "night-time" style pairs the beautiful new opaque black of the chassis with numerous glossy black details, including the mirrors, the ornaments of the classic "tie" on the front shield, the handlebar ends, the passenger handle. Refined details include a saddle dedicated to each model and a plate with the logo placed on the rear shield. The rims and muffler guard are also glossy black.

=== GTS 300 HPE Yacht Club ===
The Yacht Club was presented on 23 July 2018 and features white paintwork with blue details, matt blue rims with diamond-cut finish, specific rubber inserts on the footboard and saddle with specific stitching and finishes.

== Specifications ==
== 2003-2010 ==	GT125L	GT200L	GTS250 ie	GTV125	GTV250	60°	GTS125	GTS 300 Super ie	GTV 125 Navy	GTV 250 Navy	GTS 125 Super ie	GTS 300 Super Sport
Years in Production	2003-2007	2003-2008	2005-2010	2006-2008	2006-2010	2006-2010	2007-2016	2008-2016	2008	2008	2009-2016	2010-16
Chassis Number Prefix	ZAPM311-00001	ZAPM312-00001	ZAPM451-00001	ZAPM311	ZAPM451	ZAPM451						
Engine Type	Water-cooled, single-cylinder, Four-stroke engine											
Engine Capacity	124cc	198cc	244cc	124cc	244cc	244cc	124cc	278cc	124cc	244cc	124cc	278cc
Bore x Stroke (mm)	57 x 48.6 mm	72 x 48.6 mm	72 x 60 mm	57 x 48.6 mm	72 x 60 mm	72 x 60 mm	57 x 48.6 mm	75 x 63 mm	57 x 48.6 mm	72 x 60 mm	57 x 48.6 mm	75 x 63 mm
Power in kW (BHP)	15Hp @10000 rpm	21Hp @8500 rpm	22Hp @8250 rpm	15Hp @10000 rpm	22Hp @8250 rpm	22Hp @8250 rpm	11Hp @9750 rpm	22Hp @7500rpm	11Hp @9750 rpm	22Hp @8250 rpm	15Hp @10000 rpm	22Hp @7500rpm
Torque (Nm)	1.17kgm / 8500 rpm	1.78kgm / 6500 rpm	1.98kgm / 6500 rpm	1.17kgm / 8500 rpm	1.98kgm / 6500 rpm	1.98kgm / 6500 rpm	12 nm / 7500 rpm	22.3 nm / 5000 rpm	12 nm / 7500 rpm	16.3 nm / 6500 rpm	12 nm / 7500 rpm	22.3 nm / 5000 rpm
Transmission	Continuously variable automatic											
Top Speed	102 kmh	119 kmh	122 kmh	102 kmh	122 kmh	122 kmh	103 kmh	125 kmh	103 kmh	122 kmh	103 kmh	125 kmh
Price	€4,076	€4,076	€4,345	€4,150	€4,470	€4,590	€4,500	€4,800	€4,500	€5,600	€4,550	€4,900
Production						999						
Colours	Green, grey, blue, alabaster, black	Green, grey, blue, alabaster, black	Red, grey, black	Grey	Green, blue, white	Grey	White, black, red, light brown	Grey, white	Metallic Blue	Metallic Blue	White, black, red, light brown	Dark grey
Weight	138 Kg	138 Kg	148 Kg	138 Kg	148 Kg	148 Kg	146 Kg	148 Kg	146 Kg	148 Kg	146 Kg	146 Kg
Fuel tank capacity	10 litres	10 litres	9.5 litres	10 litres	9.5 litres	9.5 litres	9.5 litres	9.5 litres	9.5 litres	9.5 litres	9.5 litres	9.5 litres

== 2011-2020 ==	GTS 125 Super Sport	GTS 300 Touring	GTS 125 70th	GTS 125 I-Get	GTS 300 Sei Giorni	GTS 150	GTS 300 HPE series 2	GTS 300 HPE Yacht Club	GTS 300 HPE Notte	GTS 125 Touring series 2	GTS 300 HPE Touring series 2	GTS 125 Series 2	GTS 125 Super Series 2	GTS 125 Super Sport Series 2	GTS 300 HPE Sei Giorni series 2	GTS 300 HPE Super series 2	GTS 300 HPE Super Sport series 2	GTS 300 HPE SuperTech series 2	GTS 125 Racing Sixties	GTS 300 HPE Racing Sixties
Years in Production	2011-16	2011-16	2016	2017-2018	2017-2018	2017-2018	2019-20	2019-21	2019-22	2019-22	2019-22	2019-22	2019-22	2019-22	2019-22	2019-22	2019-22	2019-22	2020-21	2020-21
Chassis Number Prefix																				
Engine Type	Water-cooled, single-cylinder, Four-stroke engine																			
Engine Capacity	124cc	278cc	124cc	124cc	278cc	154.8cc	278cc	278cc	278cc	124cc	278cc	124cc	124cc	124cc	278cc	278cc	278cc	278cc	124cc	278cc
Bore x Stroke (mm)	57 x 48.6 mm	75 x 63 mm	57 x 48.6 mm	57 x 48.6 mm	75 x 63 mm	57 x 48.6 mm	73 x 63 mm	73 x 63 mm	73 x 63 mm	57 x 48.6 mm	73 x 63 mm	57 x 48.6 mm	57 x 48.6 mm	57 x 48.6 mm	73 x 63 mm	73 x 63 mm	73 x 63 mm	73 x 63 mm	57 x 48.6 mm	73 x 63 mm
Power in kW (BHP)	15Hp @10000 rpm	22Hp @7500rpm	15Hp @10000 rpm	16Hp @9750 rpm	22Hp @7500rpm	16Hp @9750 rpm	23Hp @8250rpm	23Hp @8250rpm	23Hp @8250rpm	15Hp @9750rpm	23Hp @8250rpm	15Hp @9750rpm	11Hp @9750rpm	11Hp @9750rpm	23.8Hp @8250rpm	23.8Hp @8250rpm	23.8Hp @8250rpm	23.8Hp @8250rpm	11Hp @9750rpm	23.8Hp @8250rpm
Torque (Nm)	12 nm / 7500 rpm	22.3 nm / 5000 rpm	12 nm / 7500 rpm	15 nm / 7500 rpm	22.3 nm / 5000 rpm	15 nm / 7500 rpm	26 nm / 5250 rpm	26 nm / 5250 rpm	26 nm / 5250 rpm	12 nm / 7500 rpm	26 nm / 5250 rpm	12 nm / 7500 rpm	15 nm / 7500 rpm	15 nm / 7500 rpm	26 nm / 5250 rpm	26 nm / 5250 rpm	26 nm / 5250 rpm	26 nm / 5250 rpm	15 nm / 7500 rpm	26 nm / 5250 rpm
Transmission	Continuously variable automatic																			
Top Speed	103 kmh	125 kmh	103 kmh	103 kmh	125 kmh	103 kmh	125 kmh	125 kmh	125 kmh	103 kmh	125 kmh	103 kmh	103 kmh	103 kmh	125 kmh	125 kmh	125 kmh	125 kmh	103 kmh	125 kmh
Price	€4,600	€5,100	€5,200	€5,250	€6,550	€5,450	€6,010	€6,160	€6,310	€5,780	€6,360	€5,480	€5,580	€5,830	€6,510	€6,110	€6,360	€6,660	€5,990	€6,740
Production			640		2481															
Colours	White, black, red	Dark brown	Light blue, grey	White, black, red	Matte green	Green	Blue, green, grey	White	Matt Black	Green, red	Green, red	Blue, green, grey	Yellow, black, red, white	Blue, grey	Dark Grey	Green, red	Blue, grey	Grey, black	White, green	White, dark Green
Weight	148 Kg	146 Kg	148 Kg	148 Kg	148 Kg	148 Kg	148 Kg	148 Kg	148 Kg	146 Kg	148 Kg	146 Kg	146 Kg	146 Kg	146 Kg	148 Kg	148 Kg	148 Kg	146 Kg	148 Kg
Fuel tank capacity	9.5 litres	9.5 litres	9.5 litres	9.5 litres	9.5 litres	9.5 litres	9.5 litres	9.5 litres	9.5 litres	9.5 litres	9.5 litres	9.5 litres	9.5 litres	9.5 litres	9.5 litres	9.5 litres	9.5 litres	9.5 litres	9.5 litres	9.5 litres

== 2021- ==	GTS 125 75th Anniversario	GTS 300 75th Anniversario	GTV 300	GTS 300	GTS 125 series 3	GTS 125 Super series 3	GTS 125 Super Sport series 3	GTS 125 Super Tech	GTS 300 Super Series 3	GTS 300 Super Tech series 3	GTS 300 Super Sport series 3	GTV 300 Vespa 140th of Piaggio	GTV Officina 8 300 HPE	GTV Officina 8 310	GTV 310	GTS 310	GTS 310 Super	GTS 310 Super Sport	GTS 310 SuperTech
Years in Production	2021-22	2021-22	2023-	2023-	2023-	2023-	2023-	2023-	2023-	2023-	2023-	18/4/2024-21/4/2024	2025-	2025-	2025-	2025-	2025-	2025-	2025-
Chassis Number Prefix																			
Engine Type	Water-cooled, single-cylinder, Four-stroke engine																		
Engine Capacity	124cc	278cc	278cc	278cc	124cc	124cc	124cc	124cc	278cc	278cc	278cc	278cc	278cc	310 cc	310 cc	310 cc	310 cc	310 cc	310 cc
Bore x Stroke (mm)	57 x 48.6 mm	73 x 63 mm	73 x 63 mm	73 x 63 mm	57 x 48.6 mm	57 x 48.6 mm	57 x 48.6 mm	57 x 48.6 mm	73 x 63 mm	73 x 63 mm	73 x 63 mm	73 x 63 mm	73 x 63 mm	75mmx70,1mm	75mmx70,1mm	75mmx70,1mm	75mmx70,1mm	75mmx70,1mm	75mmx70,1mm
Power in kW (BHP)	15Hp @10000 rpm	23.8Hp @8250rpm	23.8Hp @8250rpm	23.8Hp @8250rpm	15Hp @10000 rpm	15Hp @10000 rpm	15Hp @10000 rpm	15Hp @10000 rpm	23.8Hp @8250rpm	23.8Hp @8250rpm	23.8Hp @8250rpm	23.8Hp @8250rpm	17.5 kW @ 8,250 rpm	18,4 kW (25 HP) @ 6,500 rpm	18,4 kW (25 HP) @ 6,500 rpm	18,4 kW (25 HP) @ 6,500 rpm	18,4 kW (25 HP) @ 6,500 rpm	18,4 kW (25 HP) @ 6,500 rpm	18,4 kW (25 HP) @ 6,500 rpm
Torque (Nm)	12 nm / 7500 rpm	26 nm / 5250 rpm	26 nm / 5250 rpm	26 nm / 5250 rpm	12 nm / 7500 rpm	12 nm / 7500 rpm	12 nm / 7500 rpm	12 nm / 7500 rpm	26 nm / 5250 rpm	26 nm / 5250 rpm	26 nm / 5250 rpm	26 nm / 5250 rpm	26 nm / 5250 rpm	28,9 Nm @ 5,250 rpm	28,9 Nm @ 5,250 rpm	28,9 Nm @ 5,250 rpm	28,9 Nm @ 5,250 rpm	28,9 Nm @ 5,250 rpm	28,9 Nm @ 5,250 rpm
Transmission	Continuously variable automatic																		
Top Speed	103 kmh	125 kmh	125 kmh	125 kmh	103 kmh	103 kmh	103 kmh	103 kmh	125 kmh	125 kmh	125 kmh	125 kmh	125 kmh	125 kmh	125 kmh	125 kmh	125 kmh	125 kmh	125 kmh
Price	€6,920	€7,480	€7,700	€7,000	€6,920	€6,110	€6,300	€6,300	€7,100	€7,500	€7,300			€7,799	€7,499	€7,199	€7,299	€7,499	€7,699
Production												140							
Colours	Metallic yellow	Metallic yellow	Matte beige/orange	Beige, black, green, red	Beige, black, green	Black, white, red	Orange, white, grey, black, green	Grey, blue	Black, white, red	Grey, blue	Orange, white, grey, black, green	White/Blue	Blue Officina 8	Blue Officina 8	Beige, Grey	Beige Avvolgente, Nero Convinto, Verde Amabile	Red, white, black	Verde Ambizioso Matt, Grigio Travolgente Matt, white, black, blue	Grey, white, blue
Weight	146 Kg	148 Kg	148 Kg	148 Kg	146 Kg	146 Kg	146 Kg	146 Kg	148 Kg	148 Kg	148 Kg	148 Kg	148 Kg	148Kg	148Kg	148Kg	148Kg	148Kg	148Kg
Fuel tank capacity	9.5 litres	9.5 litres	9.5 litres	9.5 litres	9.5 litres	9.5 litres	9.5 litres	9.5 litres	9.5 litres	9.5 litres	9.5 litres	9.5 litres	9.5 litres	9.5 litres	9.5 litres	9.5 litres	9.5 litres	9.5 litres	9.5 litres
