= Game Technology Solutions =

GTS
- Type: Private
- Industry: Game development
- Founded: 2007
- Headquarters: Dehiwala, Sri Lanka
- Key people: W.G.T. Fernando (CEO)
- Products: Colombo Ride
- Website: http://www.games.lk

Gamos Technology Solution (GTS) is a Sri Lankan game development studio located in Dehiwala, Sri Lanka. Formed in 2007, the company has primarily worked on mobile games, most notably the 'Colombo Ride' game series which is the first Sinhala mobile game to be created. The second installment, Colombo Ride 2.0 won ‘best in South Asia’ at the mBillionth awards held in New Delhi, India in 2010. The third installment, Colombo Ride 3D won a top 5 nomination at Mashable Awards 2010 but lost to vividly popular Angry Birds mobile game by Rovio.

With the advent of Educational Games being prevalent around the world, GTS pivoted its focus by creating Educational Games targeting initially at the younger crowd. Tying up with veteran maths scholar W.O.T. Fernando and converting his books (which have sold for over 30 years in Sri Lanka) into fun educational games. Four games (Sinhala language, English language, Mathematics, Ganithaya (Mathematics in Sinhala medium)) targeting Grade 3,4,5 students were released in September 2017. 8 games targeting Grade 1 and Grade 2 students were published in September 2018 on the subjects of Sinhala language, English language, Mathematics, Ganithaya (Mathematics in Sinhala medium). Latest production includes 10 games targeting Grade 1 to 5 students on the subject of Buddhism (in Sinhala and English medium). GTS aims to create 10 more game titles by September 2020.

== Works ==
Game title	Release date	Platform
Colombo Ride	August 8, 2008	Mobile
Aba Hatana	November 24, 2008	Mobile
Colombo Ride 2.0	February 4, 2009	Mobile
Colombo Ride 3D	October 10, 2010	Mobile
Ganithaya Ha Sathuta 3,4,5	September 10, 2014	PC, Mac, Android
Mathematics with Joy 3,4,5	September 10, 2014	PC, Mac, Android
Colombo Racer	November 20, 2014	PC, Mac, Android
#LionsRoar	February 14, 2015	PC, Mac, Android
Helabasa Ha Sathuta 3,4,5	September 15, 2017	PC, Mac
English with Joy 3,4,5	September 15, 2017	PC, Mac
Helabasa Ha Sathuta Grade 1	September 21, 2018	PC, Mac
Helabasa Ha Sathuta Grade 2	September 21, 2018	PC, Mac
English with Joy Grade 1	September 21, 2018	PC, Mac
English with Joy Grade 2	September 21, 2018	PC, Mac
Ganithaya Ha Sathuta Grade 1	September 21, 2018	PC, Mac
Ganithaya Ha Sathuta Grade 2	September 21, 2018	PC, Mac
Mathematics with Joy Grade 1	September 21, 2018	PC, Mac
Mathematics with Joy Grade 2	September 21, 2018	PC, Mac
Buddhagama Grade 1	September 20, 2019	PC, Mac
Buddhism Grade 1	September 20, 2019	PC, Mac
Buddhagama Grade 2	September 20, 2019	PC, Mac
Buddhism Grade 2	September 20, 2019	PC, Mac
Buddhagama Grade 3	September 20, 2019	PC, Mac
Buddhism Grade 3	September 20, 2019	PC, Mac
Buddhagama Grade 4	September 20, 2019	PC, Mac
Buddhism Grade 4	September 20, 2019	PC, Mac
Buddhagama Grade 5	September 20, 2019	PC, Mac
Buddhism Grade 5	September 20, 2019	PC, Mac
