= Green tobacco sickness =

Type of nicotine poisoning

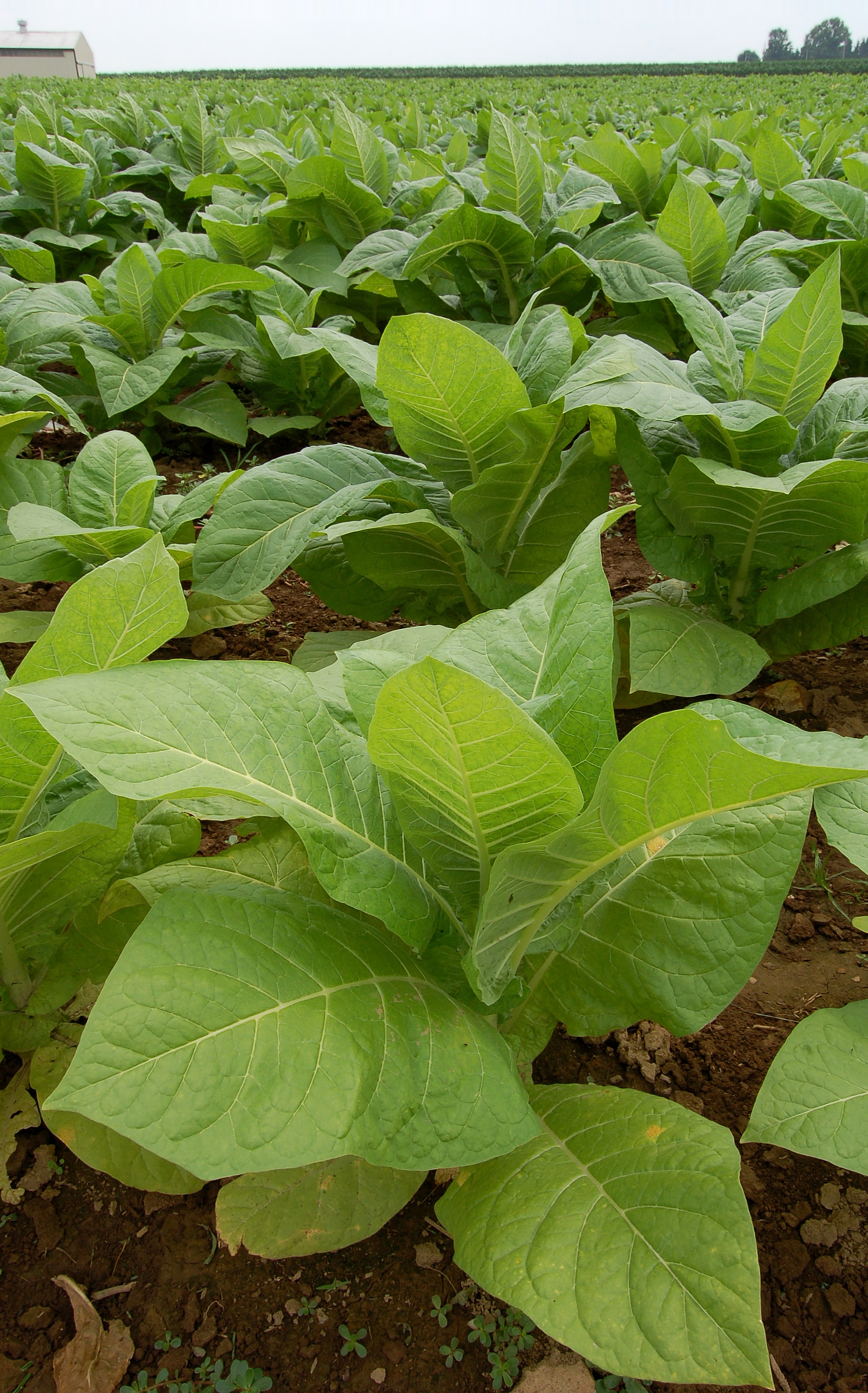
Tobacco plant

Green tobacco sickness (GTS) is a type of nicotine poisoning caused by the transdermal absorption of nicotine from the surface of tobacco plants, most frequently occurring among tobacco farm workers. Tobacco plants that have yet to be cured are referred to as "green tobacco".

Nicotine is a water soluble chemical, therefore the risk of GTS is elevated if this chemical from the tobacco plants mixes with any sort of moisture.

== History ==
GTS is a occupational illness not widely documented, a majority of known cases originate in different regions of South America and Asia, where tobacco plantations are widespread. Historically in the United States, cases were first reported in Florida in 1970, where workers were diagnosed with "cropper sickness". The condition was later recognized as what we know it as today once the exposure route from green tobacco was established.

== Cause ==
Green tobacco sickness is caused by the transdermal absorption of nicotine that frequently occurs when tobacco farm workers are in contact with uncured tobacco leaves. Nicotine is then able to be distributed throughout the body because it passes directly into the bloodstream upon absorption.

== Signs and symptoms ==
Symptoms may last between 12 and 48 hours, with the most common being nausea. GTS can sometimes be mistaken for heat stress, due to workers’ environment and lack of training on GTS.

=== Common symptoms ===
- Nausea
- Dizziness
- Headache
- Weakness
- Abdominal cramps

=== Other possible symptoms ===
- Excess Sweating
- Salivation
- Chills
- Increased heart rate
- Changes in blood pressure

== Risk factors ==
Workers that are involved in directly harvesting the tobacco by hand are at the highest risk for developing GTS, especially those who harvest in the early morning in the presence of dew, those working with wet clothes, and those working with wet tobacco plants. Those involved in barning the tobacco, a process in which the leaves are hung up to be cured, are also at a higher risk. Individuals who are new to working on tobacco farms could also be at an elevated risk due to a lack of knowledge about GTS as well as having little experience with safe harvesting practices. Younger workers have been shown to have a higher risk of GTS when compared to older workers, as younger workers might be more sensitive to this kind of exposure. Tobacco harvesters, whose clothing becomes saturated from tobacco wet with rain or morning dew, are at high risk of developing GTS. Workers can avoid getting this sickness by waiting to harvest until the tobacco leaves are dry, or by wearing a rain suit. Wet clothing that has come in contact with tobacco leaves should be removed immediately and the skin should be washed with warm soapy water. Individuals who are working in the heat are also at a higher risk for GTS, as high temperatures can increase absorption. It is also suggested that some workers may be at a lower risk than others due to activities that may increase their nicotine tolerance, such as personal tobacco use or a long history harvesting tobacco.

== Epidemiology ==
A majority of the tobacco that is produced is grown in China, Brazil, India, and the United States. It is estimated that over 15 million people contribute to the process of farming tobacco worldwide. Previous publications attempting to determine the prevalence of GTS typically only report the prevalence of this illness in one area during one farming season. Reported prevalence rates from these studies range from 8.2–47%, so further research is necessary to be able to definitively state the prevalence of GTS. The long-term health outcomes for individuals who experience GTS are not known.

== Prevention and treatment ==
Proper workplace training and preventative efforts are important to reduce the risk of GTS. Employers should ensure any worker handling tobacco leaves has gloves that can be substituted for a new pair should they become wet. Long pants, long sleeve shirts, and water resistant suits are also protective against GTS as long as they are kept dry. However, those working with tobacco plants often do so in very warm weather, so it is essential that workers are given adequate breaks and opportunities for hydration in order to avoid heat exhaustion. Wet clothing that has come in contact with tobacco leaves should be removed immediately and the skin should be washed with warm soapy water. Another way workers can avoid getting this sickness is by waiting to harvest until the tobacco leaves are dry. Training tobacco farm workers to identify the signs and symptoms in themselves and others is helpful in early identification of GTS.

There is no specific treatment for green tobacco sickness, but rest and rehydration are helpful in managing symptoms. In most cases, the illness will resolve on its own within one to two days, but symptoms may be so severe as to require emergency medical treatment which could include medication to treat nausea and vomiting and IV fluids. The symptoms of GTS are similar to those of other conditions that are common in this profession, such as heat illness and pesticide poisoning, which can sometimes lead to misdiagnosis.

== OSHA Standards ==
=== 29 CFR 1910.1200 - Hazard Communication Standard (HCS) ===
Employers are required to inform workers about chemical hazards they may be exposed to. This includes substances such as nicotine since it is characterized as a hazardous chemical, which is the can cause GTS. Organizations must also provide employees with Safety Data Sheets (SDS), Proper Labeling, and training on possible risk within the work environment.

=== 29 CFR 1910.132 Subpart I - Personal Protective Equipment (PPE) ===
Employers are required to provide employees with proper PPE related to previously assessed hazards within the work environment. PPE is used to limit exposure and prevent illness when working with hazardous chemicals. In regard to GTS, required PPE may include water-resistant gloves and clothing.

=== 29 CFR 1928.110 - Sanitation Standard (Agricultural) ===
This standard requires employers to provide drinking water and handwashing stations for employees. These help ensure workers remain hydrated during shifts are able to wash hands and forearms to remove any hazardous substances they may have been exposed to.

== Case study ==
The following case study is based on a report provided by the Centers for Disease Control and Prevention (1993) examining a green tobacco sickness (GTS) outbreak in Kentucky during the early 1990’s.

In 1992, the Occupational Health Nurses in Agricultural Communities (OHNAC) and the National Institute for Occupational Safety and Health (NIOSH) investigated reports following an increase in GTS cases, focusing on 47 of 55 reported incidents. Of the affected individuals, approximately 87% were middle-aged males, with younger workers being at higher risk. Majority of workers that experienced symptoms worked in the tobacco fields, where they encountered plants wet from prior rainfall or dew. Prolonged contact caused clothing to become wet, increased the risk of GTS exposure through skin absorption, especially where skin was exposed. Reports indicate that only 5% wore protective clothing while handling the tobacco leaves. Symptoms develop within a few hours of exposure, most experiencing nausea and weakness, while many others reported vomiting and dizziness. Symptoms experienced by workers generally lasted a few days. Most workers sought medical treatment, with only a few requiring hospitalization. Treatment provided included anti-nausea medications and intravenous fluids to assist in rehydration. Studies concluded that individuals with prior or consistent tobacco use were less likely to experience major symptoms related to GTS. The OHNAC continued to review hospital treatments related to GTS, providing tobacco workers and farm owners with information regarding protective measures.
