= Global Telecommunication System =

The Global Telecommunication System (GTS) is a secured communication network enabling real-time exchange of meteorological data from weather stations, satellites and numerical weather prediction centres, providing critical meteorological forecasting, warnings, and alerts. It was established by the World Meteorological Organization in 1951 under the World Weather Watch programme for the free and open exchange of meteorological information.

The GTS consists of an integrated network of point-to-point circuits, and multi-point circuits which interconnect meteorological telecommunication centres. The circuits of the GTS are composed of a combination of terrestrial and satellite telecommunication links. They comprise point-to-point circuits, point-to-multi-point circuits for data distribution, multi-point-to-point circuits for data collection, as well as two-way multi-point circuits. Meteorological Telecommunication Centres are responsible for receiving data and relaying it selectively on GTS circuits. The GTS is organized on a three level basis:

- The Main Telecommunication Network (MTN)
- The Regional Meteorological Telecommunication Networks (RMTNs)
- The National Meteorological Telecommunication Networks (NMTNs)

Satellite-based data collection and/or data distribution systems are integrated in the GTS as an essential element of the global, regional and national levels of the GTS. Data collection systems operated via geostationary or near-polar orbiting meteorological/environmental satellites, including the Argos System, are widely used for the collection of observational data from data collection platforms. Marine data are also collected through the International Maritime Mobile Service and Inmarsat satellites.

Use of GTS is to be phased out by 2033 with WIS2 as its replacement.
