= Ronald Davis (physician) =

American physician

Ronald Mark Davis
- Born: June 18, 1956; Chicago, Illinois, U.S.
- Died: November 6, 2008 (aged 52); East Lansing, Michigan, U.S.
- Education: University of Michigan, University of Chicago, University of Michigan School of Public Health
- Known for: preventive medicine
- Medical career
- Institutions: Centers for Disease Control, Michigan Department of Public Health, Henry Ford Hospital

Ronald Mark Davis (June 18, 1956 – November 6, 2008) was an American physician who specialized in preventive medicine and was a public health and tobacco control advocate. Davis served a one-year term as president of the American Medical Association from 2006 to June 2007.

== Biography ==
Davis was born in Chicago on June 18, 1956, to George and Alice Komessar Davis. He earned his Bachelor of Science in zoology from the University of Michigan in 1978, received a Master of Arts in public policy from the University of Chicago in 1981 and was awarded an M.D. from the University of Chicago Pritzker School of Medicine in 1983.

He served from 1987 to 1991 as the director of the Centers for Disease Control's Office on Smoking and Health and was chief medical officer of the Michigan Department of Public Health from 1991 to 1995. He later served as the director of health promotion and disease prevention for the Henry Ford Health System in Detroit. In 1992, he was the founding editor-in-chief of the medical journal Tobacco Control, published by the British Medical Association.

He became the first resident ever named to board of the American Medical Association, serving from 1984 to 1987. He was elected to the AMA's board again in 2001 and re-elected in 2005. He served as AMA's 162nd president from June 2007 to June 2008. He was the first physician specializing in Preventive Medicine to be named president of the AMA.

After being diagnosed with the disease in February 2008, Davis used his role as the AMA's president to encourage doctors to increase awareness of pancreatic cancer, a disease that ultimately killed Davis and which kills 34,000 Americans each year. As president of the AMA, Davis played a major role in the apology issued for the AMA's longstanding policies that effectively excluded African-American physicians from joining the organization. The AMA required doctors to be members of local medical associations, many of which refused to admit black doctors. Davis noted "a feeling of profound regret and embarrassment for what has been uncovered. That is why we are issuing this apology, but also because we believe that by confronting our past we can build a better future." Davis was a long-standing member of the American Association of Public Health Physicians, which collaborates with the National Medical Association on historic inequities and health disparities. Davis provided memorable keynote addresses, at the 2008 AMA meeting, and to the AAPHP on June 14, 2008.

Davis died at age 52 on November 6, 2008, in his home near East Lansing, Michigan. The cause of death was pancreatic cancer. Davis had married the former Nadine Messina in 1979 and was survived by her and their three sons.
