= Tobacco Control (journal) =

- Subject: Tobacco use
- Language: English
- Edited by: Marita Hefler

Publication details
- History: 1992–present
- Publisher: BMJ Group
- Frequency: Bimonthly
- Impact factor: 3.3 (2025)

Standard abbreviations
- ISO 4: Tob. Control

Indexing
- ISSN: 0964-4563 (print); 1468-3318 (web)
- OCLC no.: 60627031

Links
- Journal homepage; Online access; Online archive

Tobacco Control is a [peer-reviewed]] academic journal]] covering the nature and consequences of tobacco use worldwide; tobacco's effects on population health, the economy, the environment, and society; efforts to prevent and control the global tobacco epidemic through population-level education and policy changes; the ethical dimensions of tobacco control policies; and the activities of the tobacco industry and its allies.

It was established in 1992 and is published by BMJ Group. The founding editor-in-chief was Ronald Davis (Michigan Department of Community Health), and the current one is Marita Hefler (Charles Darwin University).

According to the Journal Citation Reports, the journal has a 2025 impact factor of 3.3.

== Editors ==
The following people have served as editor-in-chief of the journal:

- 1992–1998: Ronald Davis (Michigan Department of Community Health)
- 1998–2008: Simon Chapman (University of Sydney)
- 2009–2023: Ruth Malone (University of California San Francisco)
- Since 2023 : Marita Hefler (Charles Darwin University)

== Abstracting and indexing ==
The journal is abstracted and indexed in:

- Index Medicus/MEDLINE/PubMed
- Current Contents/Clinical Medicine
- Current Contents/Social & Behavioural Sciences
- Science Citation Index Expanded
- Social Sciences Citation Index
- CINAHL

== See also ==
- Addiction medicine
- Smoking cessation
- Tobacco control
- Tobacco harm reduction
