= Florida Department of Health in Orange County =

County health department in Orange County, Florida

The Florida Department of Health in Orange County is the county health department in Orange County, Florida, formerly known as Orange County Health Department, charged with protecting the health and safety of visitors and residents of that county. The estimated daytime population of Orange County is 1.5 million people. Orange County has an estimated 75 million visitors per year including the major theme parks of Walt Disney World, Universal Orlando, and SeaWorld. The county seat is Orlando, Florida.

== History ==
A local physician, Dr. J.W. Hicks, worked in Orlando from the period of 1875 onward. Dr. Hicks served as a physician with the Orlando City Health Department in the 1880s, and was president of the Orange County Board of Health. He was the first of a line of health officers to serve in Central Florida, and one of many who have served in the state of Florida. He also served as president of the Florida Medical Association, circa 1887. Dr. Hicks and his colleagues, such as Dr. John Wall of Tampa, C.Y. Porter of Key West, and others, were instrumental in convincing the Florida Legislature of the necessity of organizing the first state board of health following devastating yellow fever epidemics in the 1800s.

The Florida Board of Health began in Jacksonville in 1889. Dr. C.Y. Porter was the first leader of public health in the state of Florida. The oldest county health department in Florida was in Pensacola and dated from 1825. Orange County was a fairly rural county in the late 19th and early 20th centuries. It was the sixth leading county in the U.S. in agricultural production as recently as 1965. Orange County was originally a part of a much larger county known as "Mosquito County", when the state was added to the Union in 1845. Local county health departments were formed to help track and abate mosquito-borne diseases, organize local sanitation efforts, and provide basic immunizations and maternal and child health services.

During the 1920s, tuberculosis was a leading cause of death in this community. The Orange County Health Department began during the Great Depression, in 1937, in the Old County Courthouse in downtown Orlando. There were also several outlying clinics which provided prenatal care, and well child care. The Orlando City Health Department continued in the former "Holiday Hospital", near the present-day Arnold Palmer Hospital for Children in Orlando. The Orlando City Health Department provided mainly women's health services. In the 1960s-era reorganization of public health in Florida, the Orlando City and Orange County health departments were combined under the new state public health agency then known as the Florida Department of Health and Rehabilitative Services. As of December 2011, the Orange County Health Department was the fifth largest county health department in the state of Florida.

== Overview ==
The Florida Department of Health in Orange County is one of 67 County Health Departments in FL. County Health Departments in FL are local health departments responsible for single county jurisdictions. All County Health Departments in FL are constituent members for the National Association of County and City Health Officials. The Florida Department of Health in Orange County is responsible for Orange County which alone is larger in population than eight American states and the District of Columbia. The Florida Department of Health's responsibilities include: epidemiology; investigation of food-borne, zoonotic and water-borne diseases; emergency preparedness and bioterrorism; control of communicable diseases; health promotion and education; school health; women's health; public health dentistry and oral health; WIC and nutrition; vaccinating against preventable diseases; eliminating health disparities; provision of vital records; and protecting the public's environmental health. In 2006, the department opened the first American hospital-based vital records office, at Winter Park Memorial Hospital Florida Hospital. Publications by staff have included CDC MMWR investigations of food-borne, water-borne, zoonotic, and other infectious diseases. "Storyboards" have been published, with graphics in toolkits, by the Public Health Foundation in Washington, DC, demonstrating that quality improvement efforts improved STD and HIV public health outcomes. WIC and nutrition program staff collaborated with the Department of Health and published The Whole Grain Choo-Choo Train, a children's book which teaches small children about proper eating habits and nutrition. In 2009, the department received a series of recognition awards for best practices in public health including Davis Productivity Awards, and the National Association of County and City Health Officials. Current initiatives include the use of certified nurse midwives in a local hospital to improve pregnancy outcomes, The BABY program ("Better weight for A Better You") global climate change and health, pioneering bedside birth records in hospitals, and an award-winning video of value to H1N1 swine flu prevention efforts entitled, "Protect Don't Infect".

== Amoeba deaths ==
In 2007, the death of three children in or near Orange County, due to a rare, deadly infection, primary amoebic meningoencephalitis (PAM), prompted a public-health investigation in conjunction with the Centers for Disease Control. PAM is a water-borne infection caused by an amoebic organism, Naegleria fowleri, that enters the brain through the nose, usually resulting in death. PAM is associated with swimming and water sports in freshwater bodies and inadequately chlorinated swimming pools. An increase of Naegleria fowleri may be seen with global climate change, given that PAM is more likely in warm water. Orange County, Fla. has had 16 cases of primary amoebic meningoencephalitis (PAM), in 47 years, of 32 PAM cases recorded in the state of Florida. As of 1990, about 200 cases of PAM had been reported worldwide; as of 2007, 132 cases had been reported in the U.S. PAM occurs throughout the world, including colder climates, such as the UK and Belgium. In 2007, PAM cases were also reported in Texas and Arizona. Water-borne diseases investigated by the Orange County Health Department, the Florida Department of Health and the CDC have also included Giardia, Cyclosporiasis and Cryptosporidiosis. Techniques for identifying Cyclosporiasis were first developed in central Florida. The Florida Department of Health in Orange County, the Florida Department of Health and the CDC advise swimmers and water sports enthusiasts to wear nose plugs when the ambient temperatures exceed 80 degrees when choosing to participate in freshwater activities. However, these have not been shown to prevent the disease. Avoiding fresh water during the hot season appears to be the safest practice. Naegleria fowleri infection of young teenagers is best described as one of a number of very rare, "orphan diseases".

== Legionnaires' outbreak ==
On March 14, 2008, a Legionella outbreak, involving two guests of a hotel in Orlando, was epidemiologically traced to possible inadequate chlorination of the pool spa. On March 20, a third guest was confirmed to have had the disease. On April 4, a fourth guest was confirmed to have had the disease. The Florida Department of Health in Orange County worked with management to assess guest rooms, indoor air quality (IAQ), heating, ventilation and A/C (HVAC) systems, and other variables. The hotel was partially closed for a weekend while individual room assessments took place. The rooms and air conditioning systems tested negative for the disease. The jacuzzi was the most likely source, though the first set of cultures, weeks after the possible exposures, was also negative.

== H1N1 pandemic influenza ==
The department received focus in state and national media for reporting of a first case of H1N1 influenza in this jurisdiction because of its proximity to large theme parks. The World Health Organization's website listed suspect H1N1 Orlando Disney on its website within three days of WHO's announcing the global pandemic. This turned out to be a false report in that the index case did not involve the Disney World theme park, but occurred off-property. Xinhua news agency, Pravda, and major newspapers quoted stories from the Orange County Health Department involving the H1N1 pandemic.

== All Into Health, Board and Campaign ==
On Friday, March 19, 2010, the Florida Department of Health in Orange County was visited by the Surgeon General of the United States, Regina Benjamin, MD, MBA, who presented an announcement to the local community of a $6.632 million award for tobacco prevention policy and systems changes to prevent tobacco use and to help current smokers to quit smoking. This announcement was part of a satellite announcement with three other locations for similar grants under the Communities Putting Prevention to Work funding from the CDC. The local grant was the largest single award ever received in Orange County, Florida, for public health. Tobacco is one of the top winnable battles. according to the Centers for Disease Control and Prevention. The Orange County Health Department is engaged with other health challenges. The local project for tobacco is part of a national effort to help change policies and systems in favor of tobacco use prevention. The local project was known as "ALL INTO HEALTH", and its board was chaired by former US Surgeon General, Dr. Antonia Novello, MD, MBA, the medical director of the Disney Pavilion for Children of the Florida Hospital Orlando System. Recently, and as a result of this coalition's efforts, the cities of Orlando, Ocoee, Winter Park, Eatonville, Apopka, Belle Isle, Oakland, Maitland, Orange County itself, as well as the Orange County Florida School District, Valencia College, and the University of Central Florida, have all passed tobacco-free resolutions and smoking bans involving campuses.

== Second US case of MERS Co V ==
On May 14 the FL Department of Health in Orange County and Dr. P. Phillips Hospital, a part of Orlando Health System, announced the second US case of MERS Co V, Middle East Respiratory Syndrome Virus, in a traveler and resident from Saudi Arabia who was visiting family in the Orlando area. The infection was contained with swift contact investigation and proper handling of health care workers and household contacts. Several other contact cases were also part of the investigation. An MMWR was already published online and included an earlier case from Indiana and now a third case from Illinois.

== See also ==
- Florida Department of Health
- Charles V. Chapin
- AAPHP
