= Srabana Misra Bhagabaty =

Indian medical doctor

- Born: Guwahati, Assam, India
- Citizenship: Indian
- Education: MBBS, MD
- Awards: World Health Organization’s South East Asia Director’s Special Recognition Award; Healthcare Excellence Award

Srabana Misra Bhagabaty, is an Indian medical doctor and preventive oncologist. She was honoured by the World Health Organization, in 2022, by bestowing on her the South East Asia Director’s Special Recognition Award. for her contributions in tobacco control in the Southeast Asia region. She was also honoured with Healthcare Excellence Award in 2019 for her contribution in improving rural healthcare in Assam. She is currently leading the Preventive Oncology Department at Dr. B. Borooah Cancer Institute, which is affiliated with the Tata Memorial Centre and receives support from the Government of India’s Department of Atomic Energy.

== Biography ==
Srabana Misra Bhagabaty was born in Guwahati, in the North Eastern Indian state of Assam. She completed her MBBS at Gauhati Medical College and Hospital in 1996 and later pursued a specialization in Social and Preventive Medicine, earning her MD in 2005. After her medical training, she choose to work in underserved areas of India. She has work experiences as public health care with Government of India, UNICEF, Centre for Disease Control Atlanta (CDC), World Health Organization (WHO) and Indian Public Health Association (IPHA), Indian Council of Medical Research (ICMR), Medical research council UK , Global Alliance for Chronic Diseases (GACD) etc.

== Legacy ==
Bhagabaty has initiated numerous community health projects aimed at cancer prevention and tobacco cessation. Under her leadership a Tobacco Cessation Centre at the Dr. B. Borooah Cancer Institute, has provided counseling and support to many individuals since its inception in 2007. This center was the first of its kind in Northeast India and is supported by the Ministry of Health and Family Welfare and the WHO. Her community-oriented initiatives include free cancer screening clinics and outreach programs in remote areas, aimed at raising awareness and facilitating early detection of cancer. She has also been involved in various research projects focusing on oncology and tobacco control, including the DESH (Detect Early Save Her and Him). project and several studies funded by national and international organizations. Dr. Bhagabaty has contributed to over 3,500 educational programs on cancer and tobacco awareness, and has trained numerous health workers and community members in these areas.

== Positions ==
Srabana Misra Bhagabaty is the lead of Preventive oncology of the Dr. B Borooah Cancer Institute, Guwahati and a member of several professional organizations, including the Indian Public Health Association and the Association of Oncologists of Northeast India. She also participated in national committees focused on tobacco control and public health initiatives. She is also contributing as the Principal Investigator of the National Tobacco Quit Line Services (NTQLS) for Northeast India, Odisha, and West Bengal under the Ministry of Health and Family Welfare, Government of India (GOI).

== Awards and Recognitions ==
Bhagabaty received two awards of repute, in 2022 she received the World Health Organization’s South East Asia Director’s Special Recognition Award and in 2019 she also received the Healthcare Excellence Award. Additionally, she has received various accolades for her research presentations and advocacy work in public health.
