= Tobacco harm reduction =

Public health strategy to lower health risks of tobacco use

Tobacco harm reduction (THR) is a public health strategy to lower the health risks to individuals and wider society associated with using tobacco products. It is an example of the concept of harm reduction, a strategy for dealing with the use of drugs. Tobacco smoking is widely acknowledged as a leading cause of illness and death, and reducing smoking is vital to public health.

Tobacco use if not stopped can be the cause of death in 50% of its users, according to the 2021 WHO Report. Tobacco smoking carries serious health risks, including increased risk of developing various types and subtypes of cancers, respiratory diseases, cardiovascular diseases, cerebrovascular diseases, periodontal diseases, teeth decay and loss, and malignant diseases.

== Overview ==
The consumption of tobacco products and its harmful effects affect both smokers and non-smokers, and is a major risk factor for six of the eight leading causes of deaths in the world, including respiratory diseases, cardiovascular diseases, cerebrovascular diseases, periodontal diseases, teeth decay and loss, over 20 different types or subtypes of cancers, strokes, several debilitating health conditions, and malignant diseases. In high income countries, smoking rates have been reduced mostly by reducing the uptake of smoking among younger people rather than improving the rates of quitting among established smokers. It is, however, mostly current smokers who will face disease and death from smoking.

Nicotine itself, however, is addictive but not otherwise very harmful, as shown by the long history of people safely using nicotine replacement therapy products (e.g., nicotine gum, nicotine patch). Major regulatory and health authorities, including the United States Food and Drug Administration (FDA) and the United Kingdom National Health Service, consider nicotine to be an addictive substance, while noting that its health consequences for healthy adults are regarded as less harmful than other toxic chemicals in cigarette smoke, including tar and carbon monoxide. Nicotine increases heart rate and blood pressure and has a range of local irritant effects but does not cause cancer. None of the three main causes of death from smoking—lung cancer, chronic obstructive pulmonary disease (COPD) (including emphysema and chronic bronchitis), and cardiovascular diseases—is caused primarily by nicotine; the main reason smoking is deadly is the toxic mix of chemicals in smoke produced by the combustion of tobacco. In 2020 the WHO TobReg Study identified a list of nine toxicants for which reductions in cigarette smoke were prioritized. Nicotine itself is not included among these toxicants, and levels of the other substances are reduced when using smokeless tobacco products. Products that can effectively and acceptably deliver nicotine without smoke have the potential to be less harmful than smoked tobacco. THR measures have been focused on reducing or eliminating the use of combustible tobacco by switching to other nicotine products, including:

1. Cutting down (either long-term or before quitting smoking)
2. Temporary abstinence
3. Switching to non-tobacco nicotine containing products, such as pharmaceutical nicotine replacement therapies or currently (generally) unlicensed products such as electronic cigarettes
4. Switching to smokeless tobacco products such as Swedish snus
5. Switching to non-combustible tobacco products

Quitting all tobacco products definitively reduces risk the most. However, quitting is difficult, and even approved smoking cessation methods have a low success rate.

Cigarettes are associated with a high risk of addiction due to the efficient delivery of nicotine to the brain. Nicotine replacement therapies provide lower levels of nicotine, which contribute to lower cessation success rates and relapse among individuals attempting to quit using nicotine replacement therapy.

A higher success rate for the cessation of smoking has been reported for e-cigarettes, with 18.0% of participants remaining smoke-free at 52 weeks in comparison to the 9.9% observed in the NRT group.

In addition, some smokers may be unable or unwilling to achieve abstinence. Harm reduction is likely of substantial benefit to these smokers and public health. Providing reduced-harm alternatives to smokers is likely to result in lower total population risk than pursuing abstinence-only policies.

The strategy is controversial: supporters of tobacco harm reduction assert that lessening the health risk for the individual user is worthwhile and manifests over the population in fewer tobacco-related illnesses and deaths. Opponents have argued that some aspects of harm reduction interfere with cessation and abstinence and might increase initiation. However, surveys carried from 2013 to 2015 in France and the United Kingdom suggest that on the contrary, the availability of safer alternatives to smoking is associated with decreased smoking prevalence and increased smoking cessation. In Japan, the sales of cigarettes have decreased by 32% since the introduction of heated tobacco products.

The regular consumption of combustible tobacco products in Japan has almost halved. Among men, it has fallen from 48.4% (2001) to 25.4% (2022), and among women from 14.0% (2001) to 7.7% (2022).

A similar decline in regular consumption has been observed in other countries, including Sweden, where the prevalence of combustible tobacco use decreased by nearly two-thirds between the end of 1980 and 2024 (from 26% to 9%), and New Zealand, where the number of regular consumers also more than halved from 16.4% in 2011 to 6.8% in 2024.

== History ==
The concept of tobacco harm reduction dates back to at least 1976, when British professor Michael Russell wrote: "People smoke for nicotine but they die from the tar" and suggested that the ratio of tar to nicotine could be the key to safer smoking. Since then, the harm from smoking has been well-established as being caused almost exclusively by toxins released through the combustion of tobacco. In contrast, non-combustible tobacco products as well as pure nicotine products are considerably less harmful, although they still have the potential for addiction.

Debates on tobacco harm reduction tend to be geographically defined arguments, because of the varying legal, moral, and historical status of tobacco, and the different types of tobacco products and use in different cultures around the world. For instance, cigarette smoking is the dominant form in the United States, while use of cigars, pipes, and smokeless tobacco is limited to a much smaller population. Anti-smoking advocacy efforts and widespread popularization of the negative health effects of smoking over the last few decades have led to restrictions in the sale and use of tobacco products. Despite this, tobacco in all its forms has remained a legal product in most societies. A notable exception is the European Union, where the most dangerous products (cigars and cigarettes) are disproportionately available but smokeless tobacco products, which are far less hazardous, are banned. The exception is Sweden, where there is a long tradition of smokeless tobacco (snus) use among men.

In October 2008, the American Association of Public Health Physicians (AAPHP) became the first medical organization in the United States to officially endorse tobacco harm reduction (THR) as a viable strategy to reduce the death toll related to cigarette smoking. In the United States, the tobacco industry and cigar brands have aggressively targeted African Americans and Non-Hispanic Whites with customized advertising techniques and tobacco-related lifestyle magazines since the 1990s.

The tobacco industry has funded groups using harm reduction messaging.

== "Safer cigarettes" ==
Cigarette manufacturers have attempted to design safer cigarettes for almost 50 years, but results have been marginal at best. Filters were introduced in the early 1950s, and manufacturers were selling low-yield cigarettes by the late 1960s. Initially it was thought that these innovations were harm reducing. For example, in 1976 investigators at the American Cancer Society published research concluding that light cigarettes were safer. The study authors wrote that "total death rates, death rates from coronary heart disease, and death rates from lung cancer were somewhat lower for those who smoked 'low' tar-nicotine cigarettes than for those who smoked 'high' tar-nicotine cigarettes." However, scientific evidence suggests that switching from regular to light or low-tar cigarettes does not reduce the health risks of smoking or lower the smoker's exposure to the nicotine, tar, and carcinogens present in cigarette smoke. Indeed, the WHO recommends that misleading terms, including 'light' and 'mild', should be removed from tobacco product advertising, packaging, and labeling.

In January 2025, the Food and Drug Administration (FDA) issued a proposed regulation that would impose a maximum cap of 0.7 milligrams per gram of tobacco for nicotine in cigarettes and select other combusted tobacco products. The overarching objective of the proposed regulation is to render these products minimally or non-addictive in nature.

== Smokeless tobacco ==
It has been established that use of Swedish and American smokeless tobacco confers only 0.1% to 10% of the risks of smoking, though smokeless products in India and elsewhere in Asia contain higher levels of contaminants and thus confer greater risks. Two respected medical groups believe that smokeless tobacco may play a role in reducing smoking-attributable deaths. In 2007, Britain's Royal College of Physicians concluded "...that smokers smoke predominantly for nicotine, that nicotine itself is not especially hazardous, and that if nicotine could be provided in a form that is acceptable and effective as a cigarette substitute, millions of lives could be saved."

In the United States, a study based on National Health Interview Survey data found that 73% of smokers who switched to smokeless tobacco as part of their latest quit attempt were successful in quitting smoking. In the same study, smokers who used pharmaceutical nicotine products in their most recent quit attempt had success rates between 0 and 35%.

=== Snus ===
Scandinavian snus is a moist form of smokeless tobacco which is usually placed under the upper lip, and is not smoked or swallowed. A 2014 report commissioned by Public Health England on another avenue for tobacco harm reduction, electronic cigarettes, said snus "has a risk profile that includes possible increases in risk of oesophageal and pancreatic cancer, and of fatal (but not non-fatal) myocardial infarction, but not COPD or lung cancer." The report examined the case of snus as "a unique natural experiment in the impact of a socially accepted, non-medical, affordable and easily accessible reduced harm product on the prevalence of tobacco smoking". They concluded that "Although controversial, the Swedish natural experiment demonstrates that despite dual use and primary uptake of the reduced-harm product by young people, availability of reduced-harm alternatives for tobacco smokers can have a beneficial effect. While snus is not likely to become a legal or indeed politically viable option in the UK, this data proves the concept that harm reduction strategies can contribute to significant reductions in smoking prevalence."

Based on the mounting evidence that the health risks of Swedish snus are far lower than those of combustible tobacco products, in August 2014, Swedish Match (a manufacturer) filed a Modified Risk Tobacco Product (MRTP) application with the FDA Center for Tobacco Products (CTP). The MRTP application seeks to modify the warning labels on smokeless tobacco products such that they reflect the evidence of reduced-harm compared to smoking. Among the proposed labeling changes, the MRTP application requests replacing the current warning, "This product is not a safe alternative to cigarettes," with this text: "No tobacco product is safe, but this product presents substantially lower risks to health than cigarettes."

After five years, on October 22, 2019, the FDA granted the first-ever modified risk orders to Swedish Match USA, Inc. for eight snus smokeless tobacco products. The FDA's review determined that the claim proposed by the company in its application is supported by scientific evidence, that consumers understand the claim and appropriately perceive the relative risk of these products compared to cigarettes, and that the modified risk products, as actually used by consumers, will significantly reduce harm and the risk of tobacco-related disease to individual tobacco users and benefit the health of the population as a whole.

In particular, the FDA states, "the available scientific evidence, including long-term epidemiological studies, shows that relative to cigarette smoking, exclusive use of these specific smokeless tobacco products poses lower risk of mouth cancer, heart disease, lung cancer, stroke, emphysema, and chronic bronchitis."

== Electronic cigarettes ==
E-cigarettes are battery-powered devices that provide nicotine for inhalation in a vapour generated by heating a solution of water, nicotine propylene glycol or vegetable glycerin and typically some flavouring. They were first developed in China in 2003, and first introduced to Europe and the US around 2006.

=== Effectiveness and safety ===
When comparing people who use electronic cigarettes with nicotine to no treatment (or "usual treatment") for quitting smoking, a recent systematic review has found that: "there was high certainty that quit rates were higher in people randomized to nicotine EC than in those randomized to nicotine replacement therapy (NRT)" When comparing electronic cigarettes with nicotine to electronic cigarettes without nicotine, those with nicotine may be more effective (moderate quality evidence). Research into the long term safety of e-cigarettes for smoking cessation is limited..However, England's Office for Health Improvement and Disparities have concluded that, in the short and medium term, vaping poses a small fraction of the risks of smoking. And that, while vaping is not risk-free, particularly for people who have never smoked there is significantly lower exposure to harmful substances from vaping compared with smoking, as shown by biomarkers associated with the risk of cancer, respiratory and cardiovascular conditions. And, in an effort to decrease tobacco related death and disease, e-cigarettes appear to have a potential to be part of the strategy.

=== Types ===
There are many brands and models of e-cigarettes available today but they can be broadly grouped into three categories. First generation e-cigarettes are similar in appearance to a conventional cigarette and are typically designed to be for single use. Second generation e-cigarettes are around the size of a large fountain pen, have a battery linked to a permanent vapouriser and a refillable tank for the nicotine solution. Third generation e-cigarettes tend to be larger, with a more powerful battery and two heating elements which allow users to carry the power. Nicotine delivery has typically increased with successive generations of e-cigarette, and it has been suggested that repeated use of second and third generation devices can result in sustained venous blood levels of nicotine which are comparable with those expected in smokers.

=== Regulation of electronic cigarettes and use around the world ===
Regulation of e-cigarettes varies around the world. The Institute for Global Tobacco Control (IGTC) has identified 68 countries that have laws regulating e-cigarettes, as at November 2016. Types of regulation include complete prohibition on the sale and marketing of e-cigarettes, prohibition on their use in enclosed public places, minimum age for purchase, an allowance for e-cigarettes to be sold under general consumer product regulations and most recently, in the UK, e-cigarettes may be brought to market as either medicines or consumer products (with those seeking medicines approval undergoing the standard medicines licensing process). The World Health Organization acknowledge that e-cigarettes may play a role in harm reduction strategies, but should be regulated to minimize any potential risks. However, the vast differences in regulatory approaches evident around the world highlights the challenge of developing a global regulatory approach.

E-cigarettes are seen as an attractive alternative by many smokers to cigarettes. While the eventual regulatory status of e-cigarettes in many countries remains uncertain, public health advocates view electronic cigarette as having a valid place within tobacco harm reduction strategy. In a first step towards the regulation of e-cigarettes, the MHRA granted Marketing Authorisations (licences) for the medicinal products e-Voke 10 mg and 15 mg Electronic Inhaler (PL 40317/0001-2) on 16 November 2015. Public health researchers in the UK estimated that 6,000 premature smoking-related deaths per year would be prevented for every million smokers who switched to e-cigarettes. Since currently approved smoking cessation methods have a 90% failure rate, the use of e-cigarettes as a prominent THR modality is likely to substantially reduce tobacco-related illness in the United States, with the potential to save 4.8 million lives over the next 20 years.

A survey of UK adults found that over two thirds of ex-smokers and over one third of current smokers report that one of the main reasons they use e-cigarettes is to help them stop smoking completely.

== Heat-not-burn products ==
It is unclear whether using heat-not-burn tobacco products instead of traditional cigarettes has a substantial effect on the risk of harm.

== Public perceptions ==
Smokers remain confused about tobacco harm reduction. In a 2004 survey, about 80-100% of participants incorrectly perceived low-yield cigarettes as harm-reducing, while 75-80% mistakenly believed that switching to smokeless tobacco conferred no risk reduction.

Similar confusion exists about electronic cigarettes. In the UK, research commissioned by the anti-smoking charity Action on Smoking and Health found that in 2016, more than three times as many people think e-cigarettes are as harmful or more harmful than smoking than in 2013 (25% vs 7%), the highest proportion since the survey began. They expressed concern that the proportion of adult smokers who thought that e-cigarettes were more or equally harmful than cigarettes was highest in those who had never tried e-cigarettes, and these perceived potential harms was the main reason why they had not tried them.

In 2015 a report commissioned by Public Health England noted, as well as the UK figures above, that in the US belief among responders to a survey that vaping was safer than smoking cigarettes fell from 82% in 2010 to 51% in 2014. The report blamed "misinterpreted research findings", attracting negative media coverage, for the growth in the "inaccurate" belief that e-cigarettes were as harmful as smoking, and concluded that "There is a need to publicise the current best estimate that using EC is around 95% safer than smoking".

In an article published by The Wall Street Journal in 2016 entitled "Are E-Cigarettes a Healthy Way to Quit Smoking?", Dr. Jed E. Rose co-inventor of the nicotine patch said, "Having worked my entire career to develop effective smoking-cessation treatments, I have realized that current approaches are ineffective for the vast majority of smokers. Alternative approaches are urgently needed. The World Health Organization predicts a billion deaths will be attributable to smoking during the 21st century. Electronic cigarettes have an unparalleled potential to reduce the public-health impact of smoking, by allowing smokers to replace the habit and nicotine of smoking without the toxic effects of combustion."

== Concerns around tobacco harm reduction strategies ==
Whilst tobacco harm reduction approaches have the potential to reduce risks to the current adult smoking population, there are hypothesised potential hazards to wider public health. Smoking has become less acceptable over recent years in a number of countries, a result of a number of the Framework Convention on Tobacco Control (FCTC) guidelines to reduce smoking prevalence. The renormalisation of smoking is a concern if e-cigarette use appears to become more appealing, for example through their use in locations where conventional cigarettes are prohibited, advertising and increased e-cigarette use by parents, siblings, peers, celebrities or other influential groups.

Concerns have also been raised that non-tobacco nicotine use may results in uptake of tobacco smoking that would not otherwise have occurred. This 'gateway theory' has been largely applied to the use of e-cigarettes by non-smokers and particularly children. There is no reported evidence, however, that NRT use among young people has ever acted as a gateway to smoking, or that e-cigarette use has resulted in any appreciable increase initiation of smoking among children or adults. The Royal College of Physicians suggest that any association between e-cigarette and conventional cigarette use is likely due to common liability to use these products and the use of e-cigarettes to reduce smoking.

Dual use of tobacco products and non-tobacco nicotine by continuing smokers is another aspect which has raised concern. It is suggested that dual use could inadvertently sustain smoking by making it easier for smokers to temporarily abstain from tobacco use, or encourage smokers to move towards dual use rather than complete cessation in the mistaken belief that this offers significant health gains. Dual use of tobacco and NRT is licensed by the Medicines and Healthcare products Regulatory Authority (MHRA) as a tobacco harm reduction strategy which actually increases the chance of quitting. The Royal College of Physicians reviewed evidence around dual use and smoking cessation and reported that findings were suggestive that e-cigarettes had the potential to offer the same cessation gains, although further research would be helpful to more clearly delineate such an effect.

Much of the opposition to tobacco harm reduction has come from organisations funded by the US Bloomberg Philanthropies including Vital Strategies, the Campaign for Tobacco Free Kids and the UK University of Bath Tobacco Control Group and it is claimed that the USA is the epicentre for all anti tobacco harm reduction globally.

== See also ==
- History of commercial tobacco in the United States
- List of additives in cigarettes
- List of cigarette smoke carcinogens
