= Cigarette smoking among college students =

Smoking cigarettes during the college years

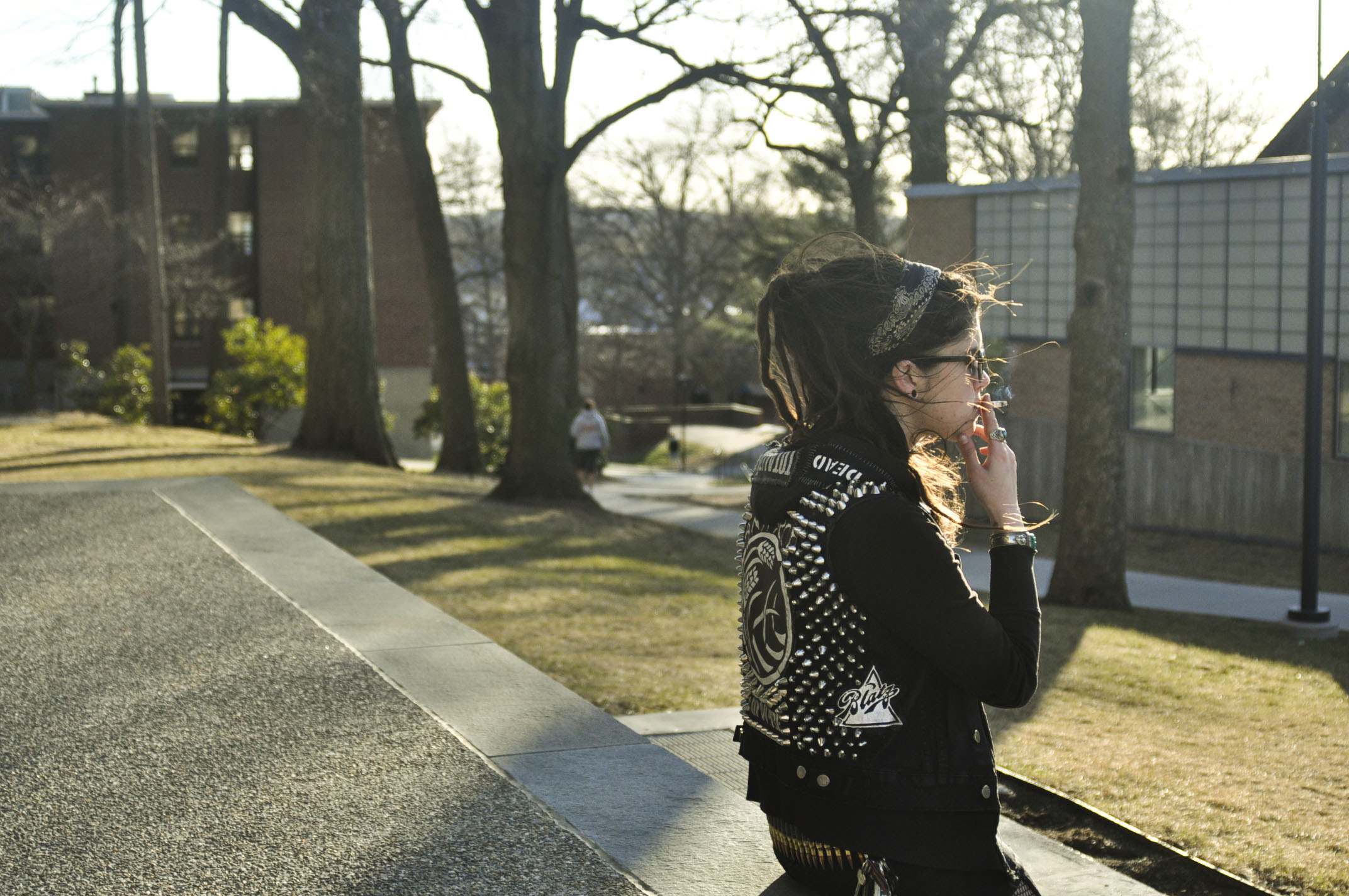
A student smoking a cigarette on the campus of Clark University

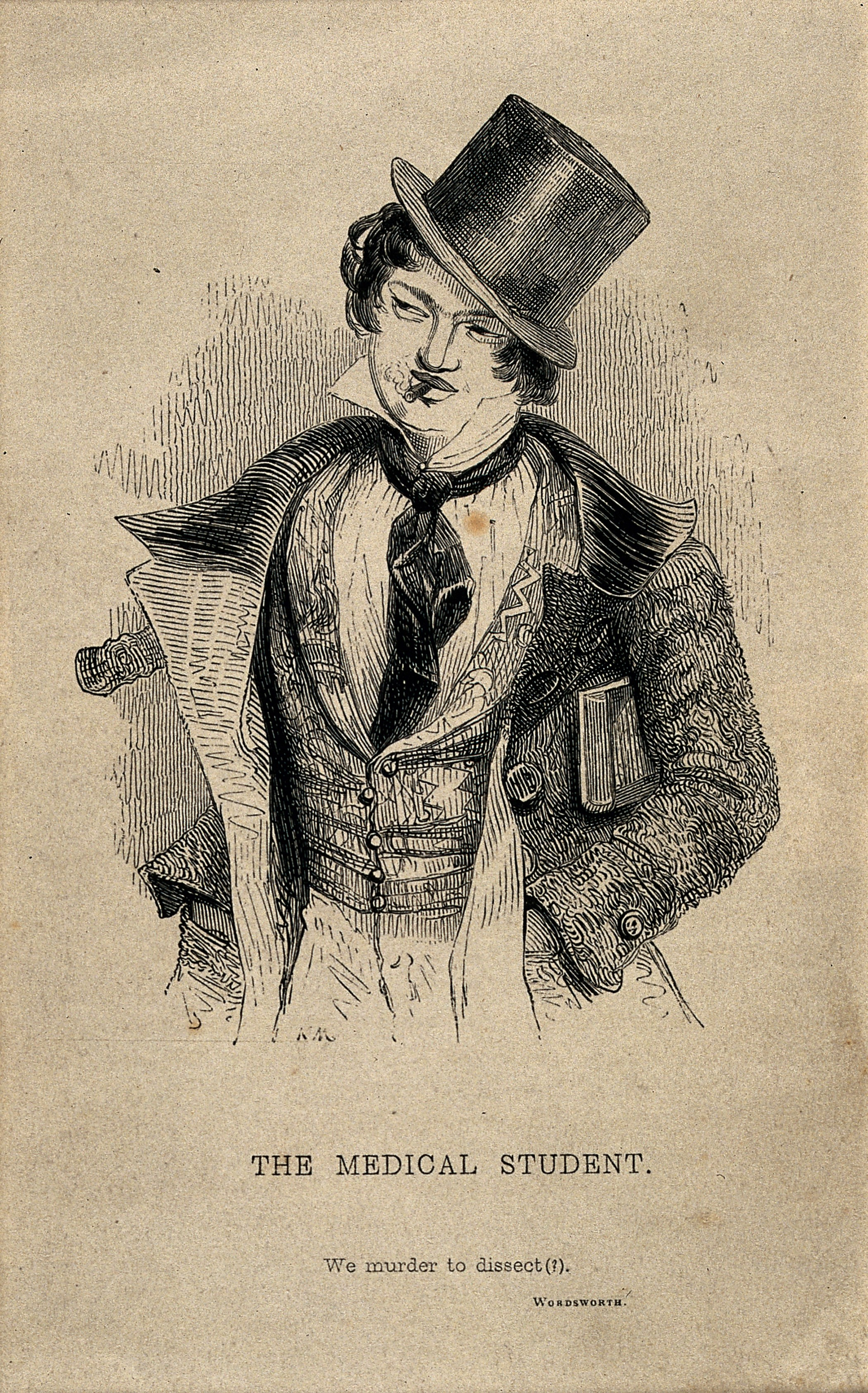
1840 woodcut of a medical student smoking a cigarette

The majority of lifelong smokers begin smoking habits before the age of 24, which makes the college years a critical time for tobacco companies to convince college students to pick up the habit of cigarette smoking. Cigarette smoking in college is seen as a social activity by those who partake in it, and more than half of the students that are users do not consider themselves smokers. This may be because most college students plan to quit smoking by the time that they graduate.

The prevalence of cigarette smoking by college students increased through the 1990s, but has since leveled off and seen decreases in recent years. Education on the dangers of cigarettes is seen as a leading cause for this decrease. This activity is being seen as less socially acceptable than it was in the past.

Cigarette smoking on college campuses has become an important public health issue and there has been increase in campus wide smoking bans and other preventive programs to reduce the rates of students smoking. The cause of these bans are now starting to be discovered and there is controversy that goes along with implementing them across various schools in the United States. Protests against smoking bans are seen as a possible threat at schools such as the University of Vermont and the University of Massachusetts at Amherst. Some smokers may also choose to neglect the bans and continue to smoke cigarettes regardless.

== Statistics ==
The percentage of college students that smoke has fluctuated greatly over the years. Studies in 1993 and 1997 showed that the percent of U.S. college students who smoked were 22 percent and 28 percent respectively. The Harvard School of Public Health concluded the percentage of college students who used tobacco products at least once a month was about 33 percent.

A study points out that from 2002 to 2016 tobacco use among college students has decreased by 47.4%. Most of the college students age 18-24. For this particular age group, the Centers for Disease Control and Prevention (CDC) says that 8 of 100 (8.0%) are currently smoking in 2019.

== Predictors associated with youth tobacco usage ==
Certain social, economic, and environmental factors can be associated with the prediction of youth and an increased use in tobacco. Risk factors include:

- Lower socioeconomic status
- Having parents, close relatives, friends, or guardians that smoke
- Acceptance and positive views of smoking by peers
- Incompletion of higher levels of education
- High availability of and exposure to tobacco products
- Violent behavior

=== Stress and emotion ===
Students note that smoking cigarettes reduces anxiety, and smoking often occurs after stressful events or in stressful situations. Studies find that depressed college students are more likely to smoke and have a more difficult time quitting than non-depressed college students. The reason that depressed students have trouble quitting smoking is because smoking cigarettes releases a chemical called dopamine which contributes to the feeling of pleasure and an upgraded level of satisfaction. 31.9% of college smokers attribute their smoking behavior as a means to alleviate their depression.

=== Weight loss ===
For women in particular, smoking is a tool for weight loss and weight management. Nicotine in cigarettes is a successful appetite suppressant, which contributes to the use of cigarettes as a dieting tool. The pressure to be thin along with a need for social approval drives many young college women to smoke. Body-conscious college women are also shown to be at higher risk for the continuation of smoking. Women who discontinue the use of nicotine as an appetite suppressant tend to gain weight initially, and women who are especially concerned with body weight will see this as a reason to continue smoking. The media and tobacco advertising play an increasing role in perpetuating the thin body ideal. Studies show the more exposure women have to images of thin women, the lower their body satisfaction, and the more likely they are to want to diet.

Variation of Smokers' Intelligent Quotient.

Research proves that smoking cigarettes lowers the potential of a person who's trying to learn new information as well as prevents them from properly and completely retrieving the information they already have but it doesn't necessarily stop smokers from creating new memories. Making things clearer, smoking cigarettes negatively affects retrospective memory but it neutral towards prospective memory. As a whole, these factors both have a bulk effect on smoker's IQs thus the IQ level is lowered because of the loss of retrospective memory.

=== Field of study ===
Some studies suggest even a student’s field of study may correlate to their smoking. The highest rates of smoking are found in students majoring in Communications, languages, or Cultural Studies, (37.4%) and the lowest rates of smoking are found in students majoring in Mathematics, Engineering, and sciences (21.0%). A study conducted at the University of Saint Joseph in Connecticut found that only 4% of nursing and bio-medical or health majors smoked cigarettes while up to 12% of students in other majors smoked.

=== Social activity ===
Smoking is viewed, by some students, as a way to socialize and take study breaks.

== Social smokers ==
Today’s smoking culture includes a subpopulation of smokers called “social smokers”. Although there may be different explanations of what a social smoker is, many college students define “social smokers” as those who use tobacco in more social activities and find it essential for socializing, rather than using tobacco on a regular basis, dictated by nicotine dependence. Social smokers are not addicted to smoking, or worried about the social acceptability of their smoking habits. In a study conducted in 2004, 51% of current college smokers stated that they primarily smoked with other people and in social activities. 71% of occasional smokers smoked in a social situation, compared to daily smokers, 19% of which smoke in social environment. Students who started smoking within the past two years of the study were more than twice as likely to be social smokers than students who had been smoking for a longer period of time prior to the study. Characteristics of social smokers have been found to include more females and non-Hispanic whites than other demographic characteristics, spent more time socializing with friends, were binge drinkers and had a high importance for the arts. Lastly, social smokers don’t perceive themselves at risk to tobacco related illnesses, nor believe they will ever become nicotine dependent. Since social smokers don’t think they’ll become dependent on nicotine, they don’t plan on quitting during college, but have intentions to quit once they graduate.

== Smoking and perceived gender disparities ==
Studies have shown that there are social differences in the smoking behaviors of males and females in college. In a 2006 study, qualitative analysis data showed that males and females have certain perceptions of their sex or the opposite sex smoking. From both male and female students’ perspectives, there were negative feelings towards women smoking and it was considered “unladylike”. However, if men were smoking, the perception was positive, and they were considered cool or gave off a “tough guy” image. In addition to drinking alcohol at parties, male students appeared in control if they had a cigarette in the other hand. Even though there were negative perceptions of female students smoking, smoking at parties is considered more of a female behavior rather than a male behavior. Despite negative perceptions of females smoking, students thought that when females smoke in groups of girlfriends it wasn’t trashy. Rather, when female students smoked in groups of girlfriends it appeared as though individual’s smoking habits were regulated by the group, instead of the individual’s dependence on nicotine. These perceived gender differences are inextricably linked with social environments where smoking and alcohol consumption occur. The perceptions of cigarette smoking in male and female students reflect similar perceptions of alcohol use in college students.

== Targeting by the tobacco industry ==
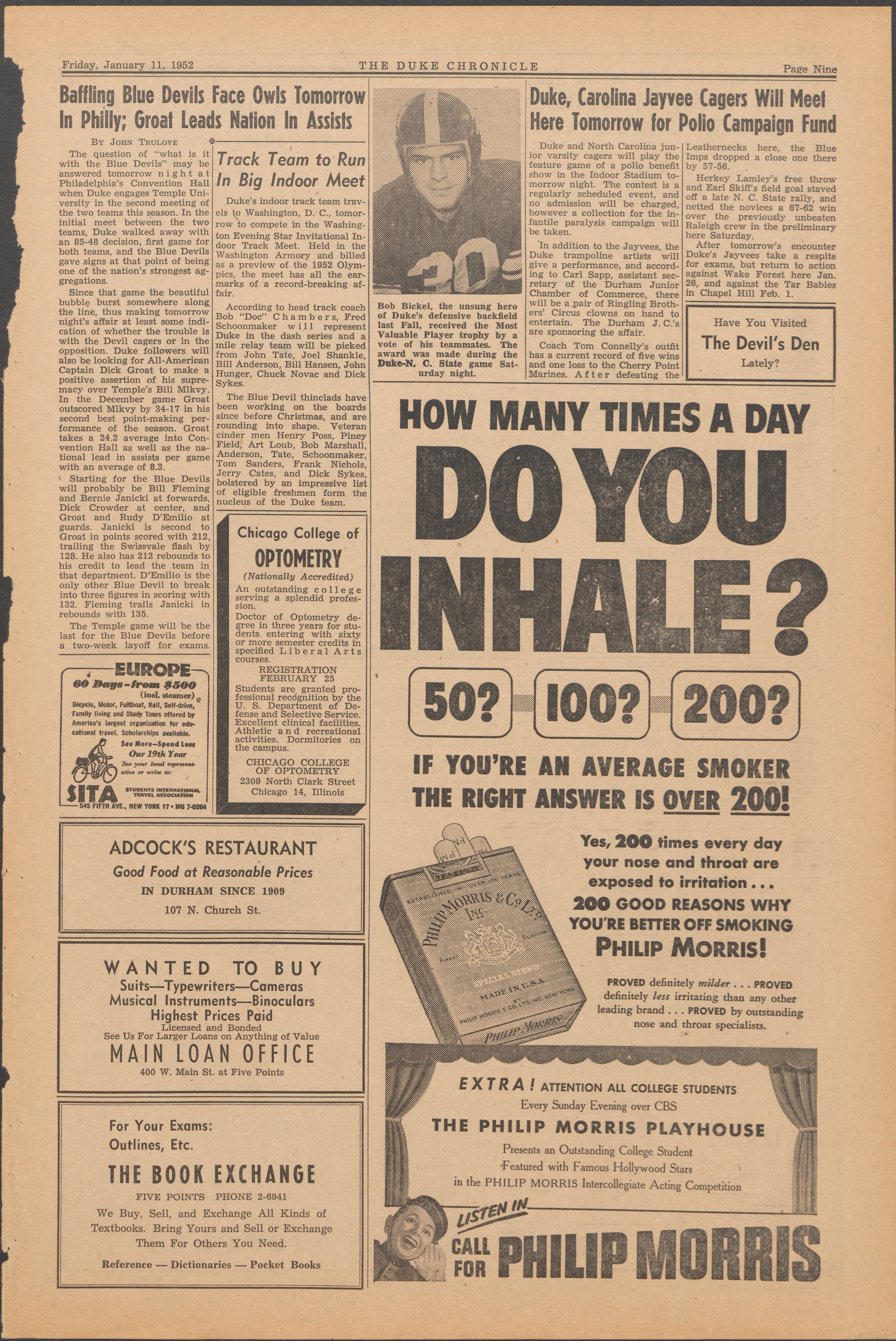
1952 Philip Morris advertisement in the Duke Chronicle, a student newspaper

The tobacco industry is particularly concerned with younger audiences because they constitute the future of smoking and tobacco profits. In an insider document from Philip Morris written in 1981, the company states:

It is important to know as much as possible about teenage smoking patterns and attitudes. Today's teenager is tomorrow's potential regular customer, and the overwhelming majority of smokers first begin to smoke while still in their teens... The smoking patterns of teenagers are particularly important to Philip Morris.

=== Replacement smokers ===
The industry refers to new smokers as “replacement smokers” because they are in effect, replacing smokers who have quit or died, whether from smoking or other causes, over the years. Young people, including college students, constitute the majority of replacement smokers, and tobacco companies have created marketing campaigns targeting this age group. These advertisements show smoking as modern, hip, cool, fun, and adventurous.

=== Alternative press ===
Tobacco companies use “alternative press” and brand recognition as another way to advertise toward college-aged students. Companies put their logo on everyday items like towels, clothing, and accessories, and this memorabilia is then given for free during events. These logos can also be seen in restaurants and bars, which are places young people frequent. During the 1980s and 1990s, tobacco companies aggressively advertised their products in bars and nightclubs, mostly targeting younger audiences. According to insider documents from tobacco companies RJ Reynolds and Philip Morris, tobacco companies had several strategies for targeting youth. They handed out free samples, sponsored parties at bars and fraternities on campuses, and hosted many events in popular spring break towns. Tobacco companies have also been known to increase their presence in post-secondary institutions in North America between 1996–1999 by making donations to universities and holding appointments within educational institutions.

== Smoking bans ==
Each year, approximately 440,000 deaths and $193 billion in healthcare costs are related to cigarette smoking, including smoking on college campuses (even though taxed tobacco amount to an excess of over $245 billion locally and is funded on the behalf of cancer research). Many campuses in the United States are attempting to reduce smoking rates among students by implementing campus-wide smoking bans. Various forms of smoking bans have been around for hundreds of years. The first recorded legislation prohibiting tobacco use was in the Spanish colonies in 1575, passed by the Roman Catholic Church.

In the United States, the first smoking bans were made around the early twentieth century and have been increasing ever since. In 1973, Arizona became the first state in the current era to pass a comprehensive law restricting smoking in public places. The numbers of smoking bans on college campuses across the country have been increasing. Between 2006 and 2008, the number of smoke-free campuses quadrupled from 34 to 160, but approximately 365 US colleges and universities have implemented some kind of anti-smoking rule, both indoor and outdoor as well as around 500 campuses have smoke-free policies set in place for their residential housing.

On the other hand, some students feel that these smoking bans violate their rights. The tobacco industry agrees that individuals should be able to avoid ETS or SHS, but believe that complete campus-wide bans "go too far". A study from 2005 found that other forms of intervention to decrease the rates of tobacco use on campus, such as restriction of tobacco distribution and restriction of smoking within 20 feet from entrances weren’t as effective as other programs like smoking cessation programs in influencing college students’ smoking behaviors. When prevention-oriented education was present on college campuses, students were 23% less likely to smoke compared to their peers who were not exposed to this kind of education. In addition to campus wide smoking bans, other interventions include health promotion programs that teach students the benefits of avoiding smoking and environments with smoke and create a general healthy college community.
