= Smoking in Turkey =

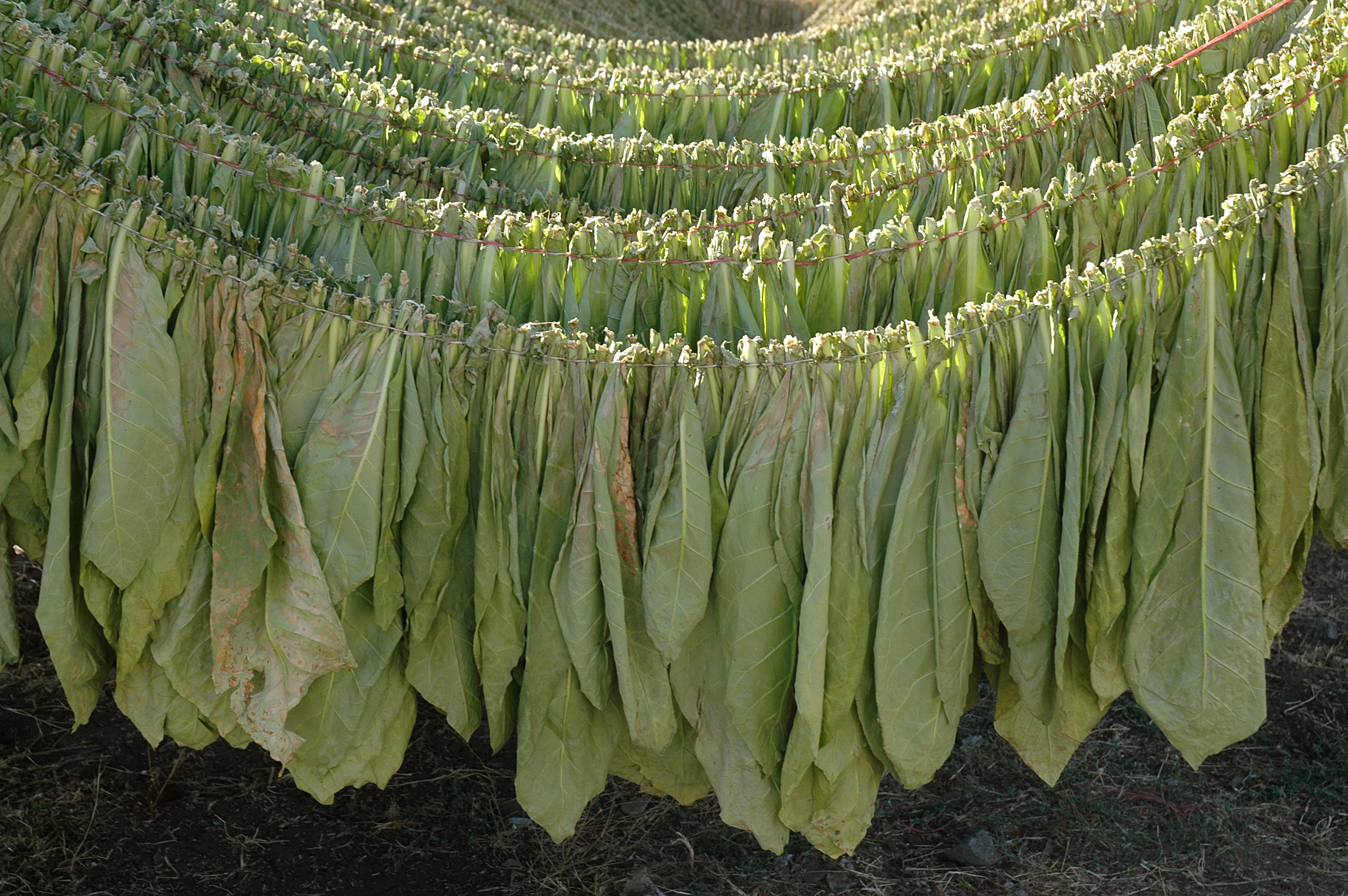
Drying tobacco in Muş (eastern Turkey).

More than a quarter of adults in Turkey smoke. Smoking in Turkey kills about 300 people every day and is banned in government offices, workplaces, bars, restaurants, cafés, shopping malls, schools, hospitals, and all forms of public transport, including trains, taxis and ferries. Turkey's smoking ban includes provisions for violators, where anyone caught smoking in a designated smoke-free area faces a fine and bar owners who fail to enforce the ban could be fined a larger amount.

Tobacco is grown and cigarette factories use 11% local tobacco as of 2023. Traditionally oriental tobacco was grown but nowadays cigarette manufacturers prefer Virginia, which requires irrigation. Smoking is a major cause of poor health in Turkey. Often locally grown tobacco is rolled illegally to avoid taxes. Rolling machines can easily be bought. Also there is illegal waterpipe tobacco.

Manufacture and commercial import of e-cigarettes is banned, so only combustible cigarettes with deadly smoke are made and sold legally. As of 2023 health impact assessment is not done in Turkey. A 2024 study said the country was almost ready for a tobacco endgame.

== History ==
Smoking was first banned in 1997 in public buildings with more than four workers, as well as airplanes and public buses.

On 3 January 2008, Turkey passed a smoking ban for all indoor spaces including bars, cafés and restaurants. It also bans smoking in sports stadia, and the gardens of mosques and hospitals. The smoking ban came into force on 19 May 2008; however, bars, restaurants and cafes were exempted until mid-July 2009. On 19 July 2009, Turkey extended the indoor public smoking ban to include bars, restaurants, village coffeehouses and hookah bars.

The ban also forbids smoking advertising and the depiction of people smoking on television. Many foreign programmes or films that have scenes with characters smoking will usually have the cigarettes blurred out. In December 2018 the law was changed to require plain packaging of all tobacco products. Health warnings messages and images must cover both sides of packages and at least 85% of the packaging.

Progress is still being made in educating the public about the law. Actual enforcement of the ban is still being implemented. The president of the Istanbul branch of the Environmental Engineers' Chamber (ÇMO), Eylem Tuncaelli, said that the smoking ban is a way for political leaders to avoid dealing with the country's real air pollution problems.

== Prevalence ==
Prevalence of tobacco use is above average. Over a quarter of Turks smoke - a higher proportion than EU countries except Greece and Bulgaria. Surprisingly, there is evidence to suggest that the rate of smoking among pregnant women in Turkey is between 8-12%. Whereas globally, smoking in pregnant women occurs in only about 1.7% of pregnancies.

=== Tobacco ===
Tobacco is grown and cigarette factories use 11% local tobacco as of 2023. Traditionally oriental tobacco was grown but nowadays cig manufacturers prefer Virginia, which requires irrigation. Smoking in Turkey is a major cause of poor health in Turkey: about a quarter of adults smoke every day. Often locally grown tobacco is rolled illegally to avoid tax. Rolling machines can easily be bought. Also there is illegal waterpipe tobacco.

Manufacture and import of ecigs (which are less dangerous) is banned, so only the combustible cigs with deadly smoke are made and sold legally. However in 2024 ecigs were widely available from tobacco shops and online.

=== Illicit tobacco ===
Turkey suffers from a severe and growing incidence of illicit tobacco consumption, spanning contraband and counterfeit tobacco products. In 2013 the estimated scale of illicit tobacco traffic in Turkey rose to 16.2 billion cigarettes per year.

According to the World Health Organization this problem is exacerbated by weak governance and a lack of high-level commitment to investigate and prosecute these crimes, ineffective customs and border controls, as well as complicity from within the tobacco industry, notably from the producers of precursor materials used in the manufacture of cigarettes. While the overall consumption of tobacco in Turkey has declined over the last thirty years, the price of cigarettes rose 4.17% annually between 1970 and 2006, driven in large part by successive layers of VAT and excise taxation.

The impact on street price for legitimate (taxed) products creates a lucrative market for illicit cigarettes that do not pay taxes and thus realize that margin as additional profit. Turkish security officials estimate the annual loss in tax revenue from illicit tobacco at around $9.5 billion. Cigarettes from Iraq were among the cheapest in the world in 2020, and they are smuggled into Van Province.

Vapes allowed to be imported carried by each passenger for personal use as of 2020 are: “One electronic device that a passenger is currently using“ and “cartridges or solutions up to 30 ml, or 10 disposable electronic cigarettes in total”.

== Public knowledge and opinion ==
As of 2024, most medical students incorrectly believe that e-cigarettes are as harmful or more harmful than combustibles: less than 5% of medical students vape (with most of them also smoking), and over 15% just smoke cigarettes.

== Tobacco control ==
Turkey follows the WHO Framework Convention on Tobacco Control and uses MPOWER strategies. The sales of outdoor heaters have increased because entertainment venues provide heated outdoor seating for smokers. In July 2009, a customer shot and killed the owner of a restaurant in the southwestern town of Saruhanli, because he was angry that his cigarettes had been confiscated. A member of the state media watchdog commented on the television blurring in 2010: "Hülya Alphas said the blurring effect being employed so frequently works against the ban because it increases attention attracted to smoking by disrupting the concentration of viewers."

== See also ==
- Air pollution in Turkey
