= Ruth Malone =

- Occupation: Professor at the University of California, San Francisco
- Known for: Tobacco control researcher Editor-in-chief of Tobacco Control (2009-2023)

Ruth E. Malone is an American tobacco control researcher and policy analyst. She is professor in the Department of Social and Behavioral Sciences at the University of California, San Francisco School of Nursing. She was the editor-in-chief of Tobacco Control from 2009 to 2023. She holds the Mary Harms/Nursing Alumni Endowed Chair.

== Education ==
Ruth Malone completed a PhD at the University of California, San Francisco and a postdoctoral fellowship in health policy research at the PR Lee Institute for Health Policy Studies at the University of California, San Francisco (UCSF).

== Research ==
Malone is known for researching the activities of the tobacco industry with respect to public health, as well as the social construction of tobacco use. Specific tobacco-related subjects she has researched include the presence of smoking in video games in the absence of warnings, and the industry's efforts to fight attempts by Congress and military officials to raise the price of tobacco products for the military to that for civilians. Current work focuses on developing the research needed to advance an endgame for the tobacco epidemic.
