= MPOWER =

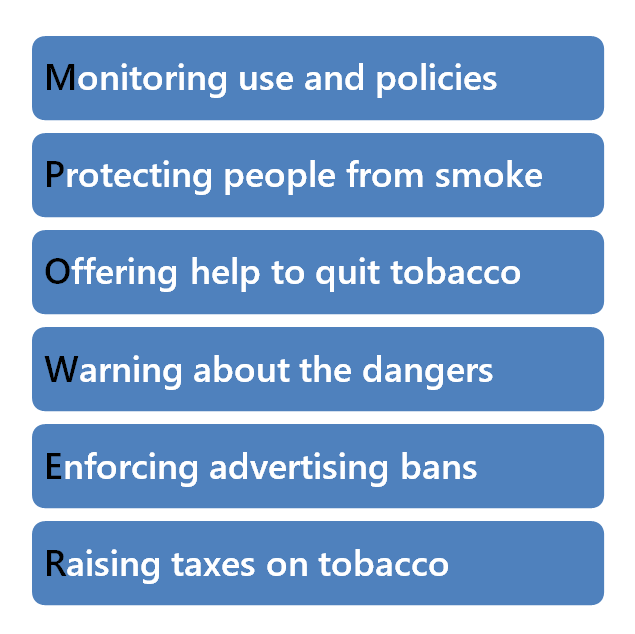
The MPOWER policy package of effective interventions for tobacco control.

MPOWER is a policy package intended to assist in the country-level implementation of effective interventions to reduce the demand for tobacco, as ratified by the World Health Organization (WHO) Framework Convention on Tobacco Control. The six evidence-based components of MPOWER are:

- Monitor tobacco use and prevention policies
- Protect people from tobacco smoke
- Offer help to quit tobacco use
- Warn about the dangers of tobacco
- Enforce bans on tobacco advertising, promotion and sponsorship
- Raise taxes on tobacco

Since its launch in New York City by WHO on 7 February 2008, MPOWER has become the internationally-applicable and now widely recognized summary of the essential elements of tobacco control strategy. “MPOWER is the only document of a somewhat strategic nature that is a source of information on the spread of tobacco epidemic, as well as of suggestions concerning specific actions for supporting the fight against this epidemic.”

== History ==
The WHO Report of the Global Tobacco Epidemic: The MPOWER Package was the first in a series of WHO reports to track the status of the tobacco epidemic and the impact of interventions to stop it. The report was launched at a news conference by Margaret Chan, Director-General of WHO with New York City Mayor Michael Bloomberg on 7 February 2008. Bloomberg Philanthropies helped fund the report. According to Bloomberg, “The report released today is revolutionary. For the first time, we have both a rigorous approach to stop the tobacco epidemic and solid data to hold us all accountable.”

Former WHO Advocacy Coordinator Kraig Klaudt developed the MPOWER brand and report's creative concept. He later helped conceptualise the MPOWER policies, which are used today by WHO to promote tobacco control policies worldwide. The report was designed by Ruth Klotzel of Estúdio Infinito in São Paulo, Brazil and the text was edited by Patricia Logullo also in Brazil. According to the International Council of Communication Design Icograda, the “graphic production of the book has a unique feature. It is a rectangular cutout that goes through all the pages and houses a gift for the reader: a box designed purposely to resemble a cigarette box but containing note paper and pens. The pens are printed with the six strategic messages of the MPOWER brand – a means of enhancing message recall.”

The MPOWER report’s unique design caught the attention of journalists covering its launch. According to the Washington Post, “WHO is using marketing techniques reminiscent of the tobacco companies. It has branded the campaign MPOWER – each letter represents one of six strategies – and is eschewing scare tactics in favor of the theme ‘fresh and alive.’ Press materials came with a box that looks like a pack of cigarettes and contains a pad and pens describing the elements of the campaign.” Said Sandra Mullin, a spokeswoman for the World Lung Foundation, “We're co-opting the tobacco industry's branding strategies to capture the attention of government officials. We want to show that they don't own those mottos – freshness and fun and health.”

As of 2013, Bloomberg Philanthropies had invested US$600 million to support implementation of the MPOWER tobacco control policies. The Philanthropy works through a global network of partners to support countries implementing comprehensive tobacco control policies, including the Campaign for Tobacco-Free Kids, the CDC Foundation, Johns Hopkins Bloomberg School of Public Health, the International Union Against Tuberculosis and Lung Disease, the World Health Organization, and the World Lung Foundation. The Bloomberg's initiative also received an investment from the Bill and Melinda Gates Foundation.

In February 2023, Bloomberg Philanthropies pledged an additional US$420 million over four years for tobacco control. In June 2025, Bloomberg Philanthropies announced a US$20 million “Accelerator Fund” aimed at supporting countries with stalled tobacco-control progress or those close to implementing measures.

== Impact ==
The findings of a July 2013 WHO report showed that 2.3 billion people – more than a third of the world’s population – are covered by at least one effective MPOWER tobacco control measure, an increase from the 1 billion covered in 2008. In Turkey, the MPOWER strategy had helped lead to 1.2 million fewer adult smokers in the country.

Since the launch of the MPOWER strategy, 18 countries with almost 750 million citizens have passed 100% smoke-free laws including Brazil, Turkey and Pakistan. Several of the world’s largest cities have also gone smoke-free, including Mexico City, Jakarta, and China’s Harbin City. Additionally, 11 countries have passed graphic cigarette pack warning laws and seven countries have passed comprehensive advertising and sponsorship bans that are newly protecting 400 million and 200 million people, respectively.

A 2013 study found that 7 out of 9 recent international human rights treaties contained at least one policy area addressed by the MPOWER strategy, including 30 different articles.

A 2017 study found that MPOWER policies were effective to reduce smoking prevalence and cigarette consumption. It calculated an 'MPOWER composite score' (ranging from 6 to 29) measuring policy implementation for each country from 2007 to 2014. A 1-unit increase in the score reduces smoking prevalence by 0.2 percentage points among adults and a reduction of 1 pack of cigarettes of consumption per capita per year.

A 2025 WHO report stated that 6.1 billion people worldwide were at least protected by one MPOWER measure as most countries still work to fight against tobacco. It is also stated that, since 2007, 155 countries have implemented at least one of the six measures at the ‘best-practice’ level. Four countries - Brazil, Mauritius, the Netherlands and Turkey - have achieved the full MPOWER package. WHO also reported that in 2025 a total of 79 countries had implemented smoke-free environments amounting to the coverage of about one-third of the world’s population and 110 countries required graphic health warnings on tobacco packaging.

== See also ==
- Tobacco control
- WHO Framework Convention on Tobacco Control
- World Lung Foundation
- World No Tobacco Day
- SAFER (alcohol policy package)
