= Tobacco-free college campuses =

Tobacco-free college campuses are institutions that have implemented policies banning the use of tobacco products in all indoor and outdoor areas. The stated aim of these policies is to reduce cigarette smoking among college students and to protect people on campus from secondhand smoke. A banner promoting a smoke-free campus initiative often accompanies these efforts.

While some schools only prohibit smoking, others extend the ban to include all forms of tobacco, cannabis, and similar substances. The specifics of these policies vary, with each institution setting its own level of strictness. Many institutions also offer cessation programs and ongoing support to help students quit using tobacco.

== Rationale ==
Numerous surveys have indicated that implementing tobacco-free policies reduces students exposure to secondhand smoke on campuses. However, in Fall of 2006 an online survey of 4,160 students from 10 different colleges found that most second hand smoke was experienced by students in restaurants/bars (65%), at home (55%) and in a car (38%), suggesting that on campus bans may be less effective.

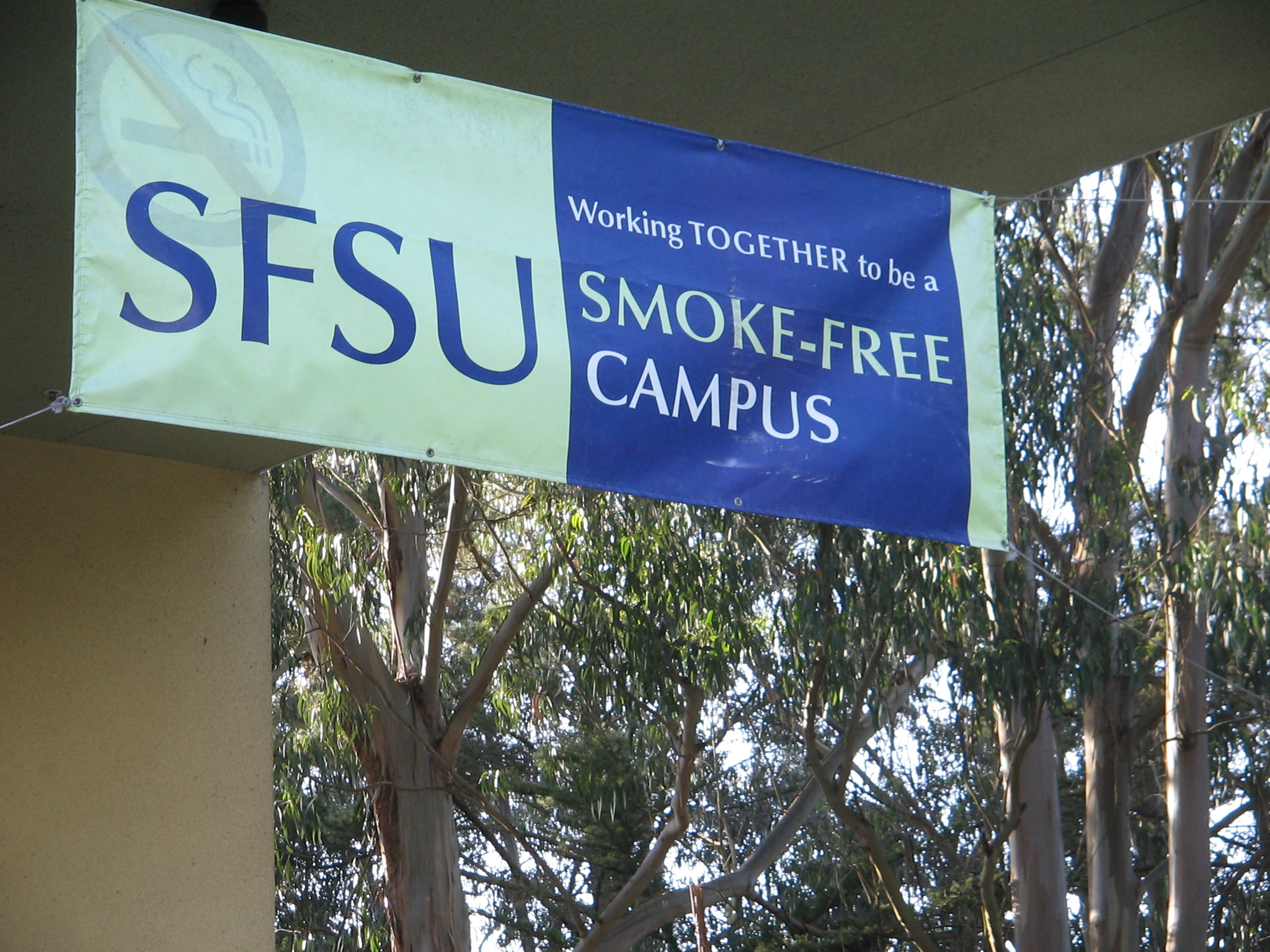
Poster in SFSU

== History ==
In 1990, San Luis Obispo, California, became the first city in the world to completely ban smoking in all public places. In 1998, the State of California banned smoking in all public places statewide. As of April 1, 2020, there are now at least 2,490 campus sites that are 100% smoke-free. Of these, 2,065 are 100% tobacco-free, and 2,097 also prohibit e-cigarette use.

== Policies overview ==
A tobacco-free policy limits or eliminates the use of any tobacco product, including, but not limited to, cigarettes, cigars, cigarillos, mini-cigars, hookah, spit tobacco, snus, and other smokeless products. It also often includes innovations in smoke or tobacco products, such as electronic cigarettes. Also, a comprehensive tobacco-free program may also address tobacco sales, marketing, sponsorship and investments.

=== Policies by school ===
==== University of California ====
All of the University of California (UC) campuses went tobacco-free on January 1, 2014.

=== Statewide policies ===
Some states such as Louisiana have chosen to institute a statewide smoke-free policy for all educational institutions. Other states such as California have issued narrower bans.

Washington State Colleges

There is a total of 17 college campuses across Washington State that institute a 100% tobacco-free campus. The rest are in the process of implementing a 100% tobacco-free policy from a smoke-free or type of tobacco-free policy, or from no policy to 100% tobacco-free policy. These campuses range from community colleges to public and private universities as well. Most schools already have a smoke-free policy and are moving towards a 100% tobacco free-policy.

Florida State Colleges

There is a total of 41 college campuses in Florida that institute a 100% smoke-free college campus. Their policy entails 100% ban on the use of conventional cigarettes. Areas of the policy include the following; campuses, parking lots, college-sponsored off-campus events and campus owned vehicles. Depending on the policy, e-cigarette use may be prohibited.

==== California Community Colleges ====
In May 2018, the Board of Governors voted to make all California Community Colleges tobacco free. A number of California Community Colleges had already made this policy change on their campus or had been working toward the goal of a 100% smoke and tobacco free policy. The rationale of the Board of Governors to pass this included reasons such as: tobacco is responsible for about 1 in 5 deaths, there is no safe level of secondhand smoke, and smoking on campus can lead to secondhand smoke entering buildings via open doors or windows and exposure when walking by a smoker.

==== California State Universities ====
In 2016, Governor Jerry Brown vetoed legislation that would have banned smoking on all California State University (CSU) campuses believing that the campuses should make their own individual policies. In April 2017, the CSU Chancellor's office issued an executive order making all CSU campuses smoke and tobacco free.

== Effectiveness ==
In recent years, tobacco free campuses has been recognized by the American Cancer Society's Tobacco-free Generation Campus Initiative. In cooperation with the CVS Health Foundation, since its foundation in 2016 the ACS has provided over 97 grants up to $20,000 to colleges across the country.

=== Other Policies to Limit Tobacco Use ===
Many schools are helping students quit using tobacco on campus by providing counseling, online support, and nicotine replacements such as gum, patches, and lozenges. A 2014 survey found that 55% of responding Student Health Center staff asked their patients about their tobacco use at every visit, and 80% offered counseling to students who wished to quit. According to this survey, 54% of health care providers were specifically trained in effective intervention.

=== Cessation programs vs. restricted availability ===
Cessation programs that educate, inform, and influence users to quit smoking are often posited as alternative to tobacco bans. A 2005 study found that restriction of tobacco distribution and restriction of smoking within 20 feet of entrances were not as effective as smoking cessation programs in decreasing college students' smoking. When prevention-oriented education was present on college campuses, students were 23% less likely to smoke compared to their peers who were not exposed to this kind of education. On the other hand, a 2015 study found a negative correlation between policy strictness increased and exposure to secondhand smoke, suggesting harsher policies such as tobacco bans may be more effective.

=== Challenges to Tobacco Free College Policies ===
Tobacco policies may be less effective in areas of poverty and in community colleges. In 2014, an observational study performed by numerous tobacco truth organizations indicated areas where progress was more inhibited than others. Data collected indicated only 19% of community colleges in the U.S. had implemented a comprehensive tobacco-free policy and only one-third of historically black colleges. In an effort to improve these low statistics, an effort called the College Initiative Program was Established which created a 5-step program which included 135 institutions to help create successful tobacco-free policies. By 2017, it was found that 87% of the 135 participating colleges had either started or finished in creating successful anti-tobacco/smoking policies. Some have used this to argue that community colleges and poverty-stricken locations simply lack funding and opportunity to develop educational policies and programs. A study published in 2020 has found that social norms, smoking status, second-hand smoke exposure, and socio-demographic factors all play a role in determining the attitudes and behaviors of students, staff and faculty towards smoke-free campuses and in turn can affect the success of tobacco-free campus initiatives.
