= Prevalence of tobacco use =

Percentage of population smoking tobacco

Prevalence of tobacco use is reported by the World Health Organization (WHO), which focuses on cigarette smoking due to reported data limitations. Smoking has therefore been studied more extensively than any other form of consumption.

Smoking is globally five times more prevalent among men than women; however, the gender gap is narrower in developed countries and in younger age groups. Among developed nations, smoking rates for both men and women have begun to decline. Smoking prevalence has changed little since the mid-1990s, before which time it declined in English-speaking countries due to the implementation of tobacco control. However, the number of smokers worldwide has increased from 721 million in 1980 to 967 million in 2012, and the number of cigarettes smoked increased from 4.96 trillion to 6.25 trillion due to population growth.

In Western countries, smoking is more prevalent among populations with mental health problems, with alcohol and drug problems, among criminals, among the working poor, and among the homeless. In 2002, about 20% of young teens (aged 13–15) smoked worldwide. 80,000 to 100,000 children begin smoking every day. Half of those who begin smoking in adolescent years are projected to go on to smoke for 15 to 20 years.

One of the targets of the Sustainable Development Goal 3 of the United Nations (to be achieved by 2030) is to "Strengthen the implementation of the World Health Organization Framework Convention on Tobacco Control in all countries, as appropriate." The indicator that is used to measure progress is the prevalence of tobacco use.

== Background ==
Prevalence of tobacco use

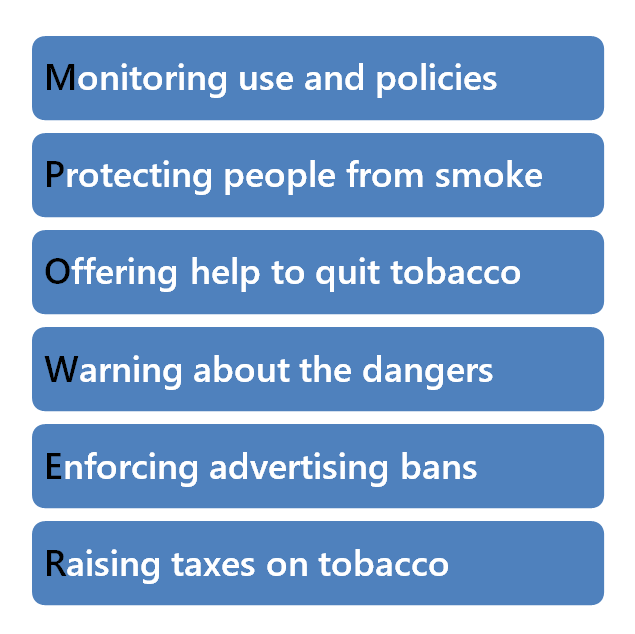
Implementing the MPOWER policy package of effective interventions for tobacco control reduces prevalence of tobacco use.

WHO states that "Much of the disease burden and premature mortality attributable to tobacco use disproportionately affect the poor". Of the 1.22 billion smokers, 1 billion of them live in developing or transitional economies. Rates of smoking have leveled off or declined in the developed world. In the developing world, tobacco consumption is rising by 3.4% per year as of 2002.

The WHO in 2004 projected 58.8 million deaths to occur globally, of which 5.4 million were tobacco-attributed, and 4.9 million as of 2007. As of 2002, 70% of the deaths are in developing countries.

One of the targets of the Sustainable Development Goal 3 of the United Nations (to be achieved by 2030) is to "Strengthen the implementation of the World Health Organization Framework Convention on Tobacco Control in all countries, as appropriate." The indicator that is used to measure progress is the "age-standardized prevalence of current tobacco use among persons aged 15 years and older".

A 2017 study found that MPOWER policies were effective to reduce smoking prevalence and cigarette consumption. It calculated an 'MPOWER composite score' (ranging from 6 to 29) measuring policy implementation for each country from 2007 to 2014. A 1-unit increase in the score reduces smoking prevalence by 0.2 percentage points among adults and a reduction of 1 pack of cigarettes of consumption per capita per year.

Share of men who are smoking

Share of women who are smoking

== Worldwide ==
Prevalence of tobacco use (% of adults) worldwide
2000	2005	2010	2015	2020	2024
34.8%	30.9%	27.5%	24.5%	22%	20.3%

== Countries ==
The following is a list of countries by the percentage of age-standardized prevalence of tobacco use (including products such as snus) among persons 15 years and older as published by the World Health Organization.

Click at right to show/hide list of countries

Country	2000	2020
Afghanistan	36.9	23.3
Albania	35	22.4
Algeria	22.2	21
Andorra	35.9	31.8
Argentina	34	24.5
Armenia	32	25.5
Australia	24.4	13.6
Austria	52.3	26.4
Azerbaijan	28.7	24
Bahamas	10.7	10.6
Bahrain	22.2	14.9
Bangladesh	57.6	34.7
Barbados	10.2	8.5
Belarus	41.8	30.5
Belgium	33.4	23.4
Belize	15	8.5
Benin	16.7	6.9
Bolivia	32.1	12.7
Bosnia and Herzegovina	46.6	35
Botswana	33.2	19.4
Brazil	23.8	12.8
Brunei	16.7	16.2
Bulgaria	47.5	39
Burkina Faso	29.8	14.3
Burundi	24	11.8
Cape Verde	20.6	11.4
Cambodia	42.3	21.1
Cameroon	12.8	7.3
Canada	28.4	13
Chad	13.9	8.3
Chile	46.9	29.2
China	26.7	25.6
Colombia	15.1	8.5
Comoros	39.5	20.3
Congo	11.9	14.5
Cook Islands	44.3	24
Costa Rica	18	8.8
Ivory Coast	18.7	9.4
Croatia	34.4	36.9
Cuba	40.8	17.9
Cyprus	40.9	35.1
Czech Republic	34.2	30.7
Denmark	37.3	17.5
Dominican Republic	18.7	10.6
DR Congo	18.8	12.8
Ecuador	18.4	11.3
Egypt	24.3	24.3
El Salvador	15.9	7.9
Eritrea	13.3	7.5
Estonia	46	29.7
Eswatini	12.3	9.2
Ethiopia	6.8	5.1
Fiji	32.3	23.1
Finland	35.7	21.6
France	34.2	33.4
Gambia	22.5	11.1
Georgia	32.8	31.7
Germany	36.4	22
Ghana	7	3.5
Greece	54.9	33.5
Guatemala	14.3	10.9
Guinea-Bissau	18	9
Guyana	30.2	12.1
Haiti	12.3	7.7
Hungary	37.4	31.8
Iceland	30.2	12
India	54.5	27.2
Indonesia	35.4	37.6
Iran	21.5	13.6
Iraq	22	18.5
Ireland	35.6	20.8
Israel	31.7	21.2
Italy	26.2	23.1
Jamaica	17.4	9.4
Japan	33.3	20.1
Jordan	30.7	34.8
Kazakhstan	34.2	23.2
Kenya	19.3	11.1
Kiribati	68.5	40.6
Kuwait	20	17.9
Kyrgyzstan	31.4	25.4
Laos	52.5	31.8
Latvia	43.8	37
Lebanon	40.2	38.2
Lesotho	31.1	24.3
Liberia	16.3	8.2
Lithuania	41.4	32
Luxembourg	31	21.1
Madagascar	46.7	27.8
Malawi	24.1	10.8
Malaysia	29.5	22.5
Maldives	38.3	25.2
Mali	16.3	8.3
Malta	34.3	24
Marshall Islands	28.5	28.5
Mauritania	21.3	10.7
Mauritius	25.5	20.2
Mexico	24	13.1
Moldova	25.3	29
Mongolia	34.1	29.4
Montenegro	38.7	31.4
Morocco	22.5	14.5
Mozambique	29.4	14.3
Myanmar	66.9	44.1
Namibia	25.6	15.1
Nauru	63.4	48.5
Nepal	64.5	30.4
Netherlands	34.3	22.2
New Zealand	29.6	13.7
Niger	9.7	7.4
Nigeria	9.3	3.7
North Korea	19.8	18.8
Norway	44	16.2
Oman	7.6	8
Pakistan	37.5	20.2
Palau	26.1	17.6
Panama	13.4	5
Papua New Guinea	54.1	39.3
Paraguay	29.1	11.5
Peru	32.9	8.1
Philippines	34.9	22.9
Poland	39.6	24
Portugal	25.7	25.4
Qatar	13.5	11.8
Romania	35	28
Russia	33.3	26.8
Rwanda	24.8	13.7
Samoa	39	25.3
São Tomé and Príncipe	7.8	5.7
Saudi Arabia	14.2	14.3
Senegal	14.3	6.9
Serbia	45.1	39.8
Seychelles	28.7	20.2
Sierra Leone	43.7	13.5
Singapore	16.4	16.5
Slovakia	32	31.5
Slovenia	25.1	22
Solomon Islands	43.5	36.5
South Africa	23.5	20.3
South Korea	28.5	17.4
Spain	36.8	27.7
Sri Lanka	28.5	22
Sweden	43.8	24
Switzerland	28.3	25.5
Tanzania	27.8	8.7
Thailand	31.7	22.1
Timor-Leste	53.5	39.2
Togo	14.4	6.8
Tonga	33.5	31
Tunisia	34.3	24.6
Turkey	32.9	30.7
Turkmenistan	12	5.5
Tuvalu	48.8	35.6
Uganda	24.7	8.4
Ukraine	37.7	25.8
United Arab Emirates	19.4	18.2
United Kingdom	37.9	15.4
United States	33.8	23
Uruguay	35.3	21.5
Uzbekistan	24.9	17.6
Vanuatu	25.6	17.8
Vietnam	29.8	24.8
Yemen	27.3	20.3
Zambia	19.9	14.4
Zimbabwe	21	11.7

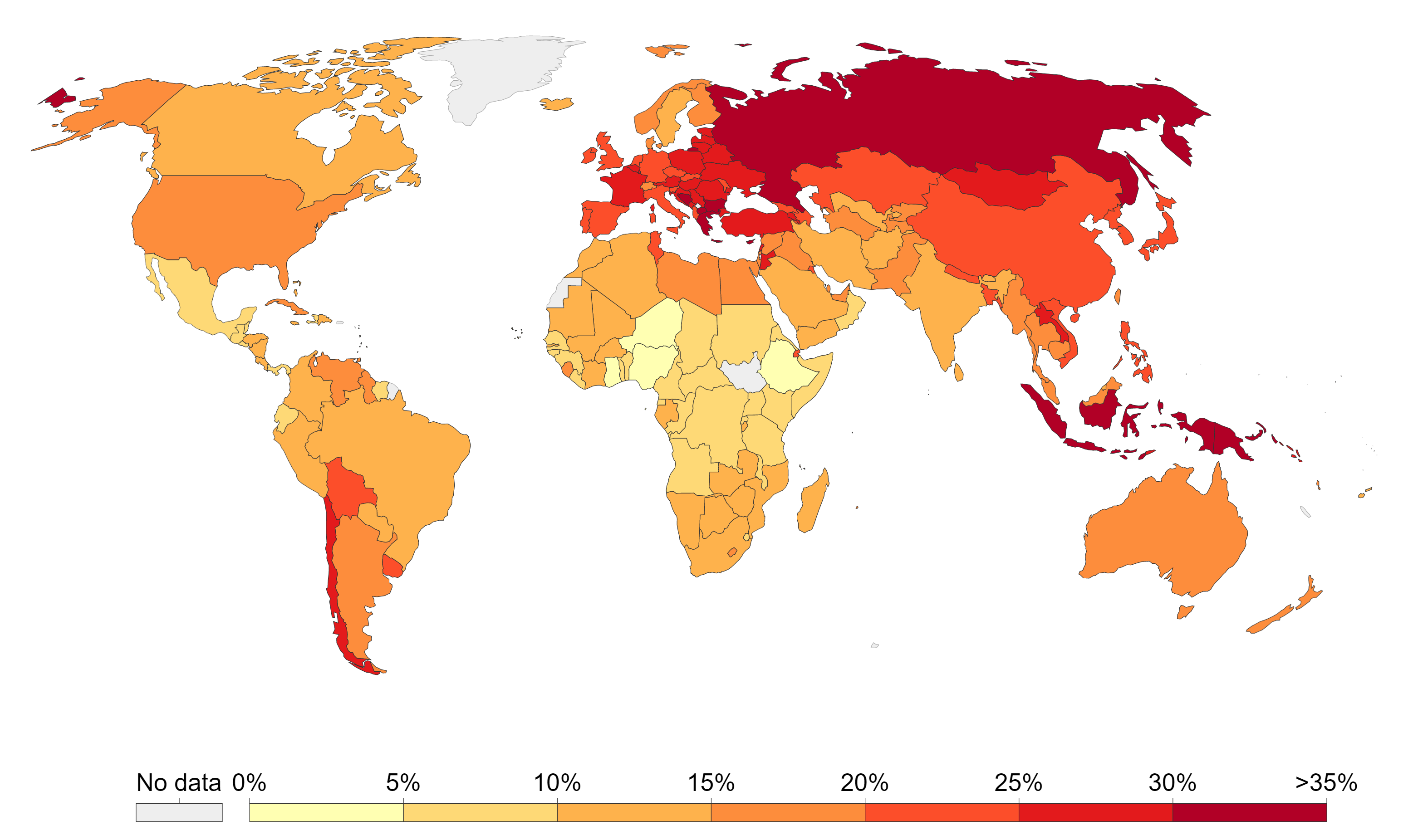
Prevalence of daily smoking in 2012

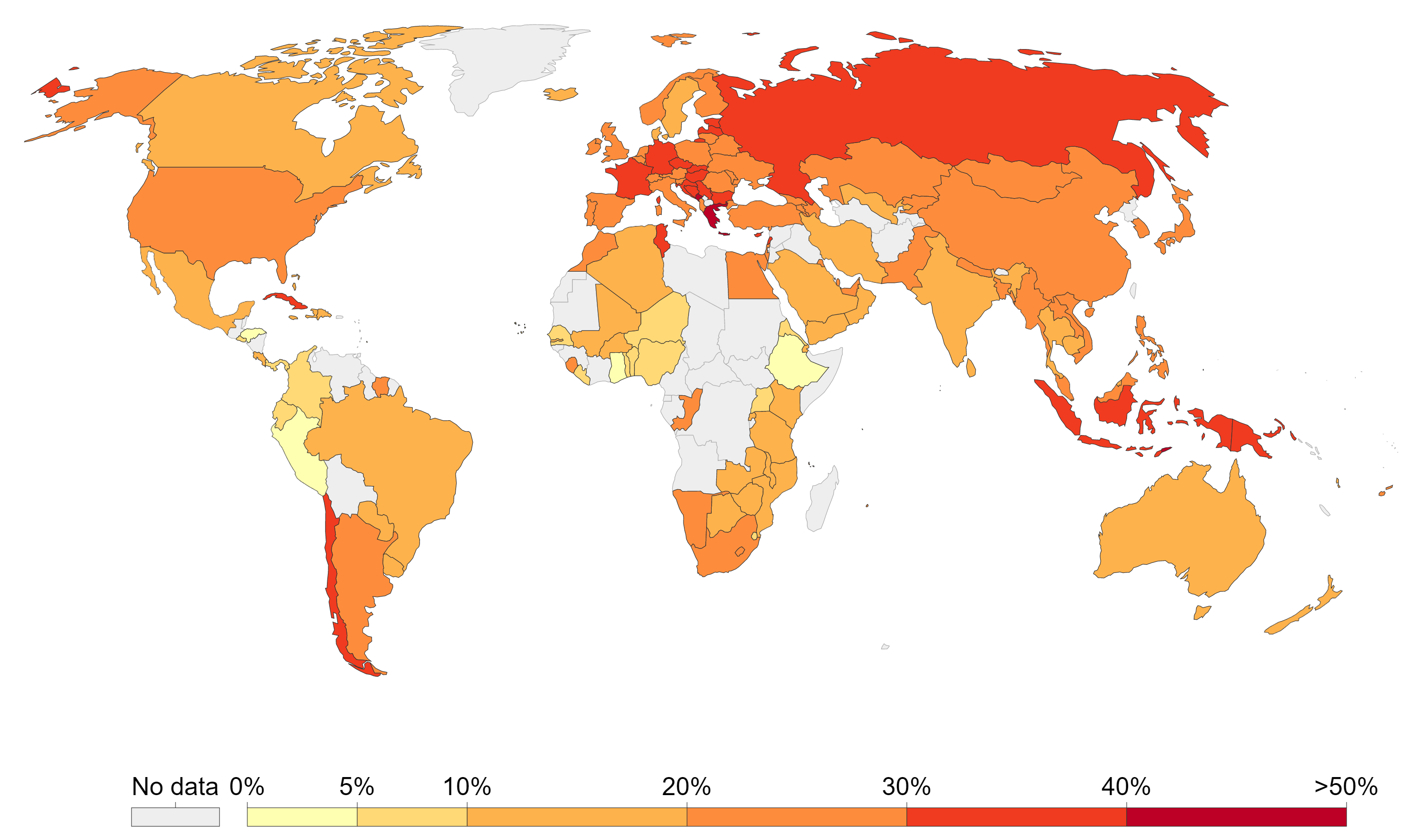
The share adults who smoke any tobacco product on a daily or non-daily basis in 2016

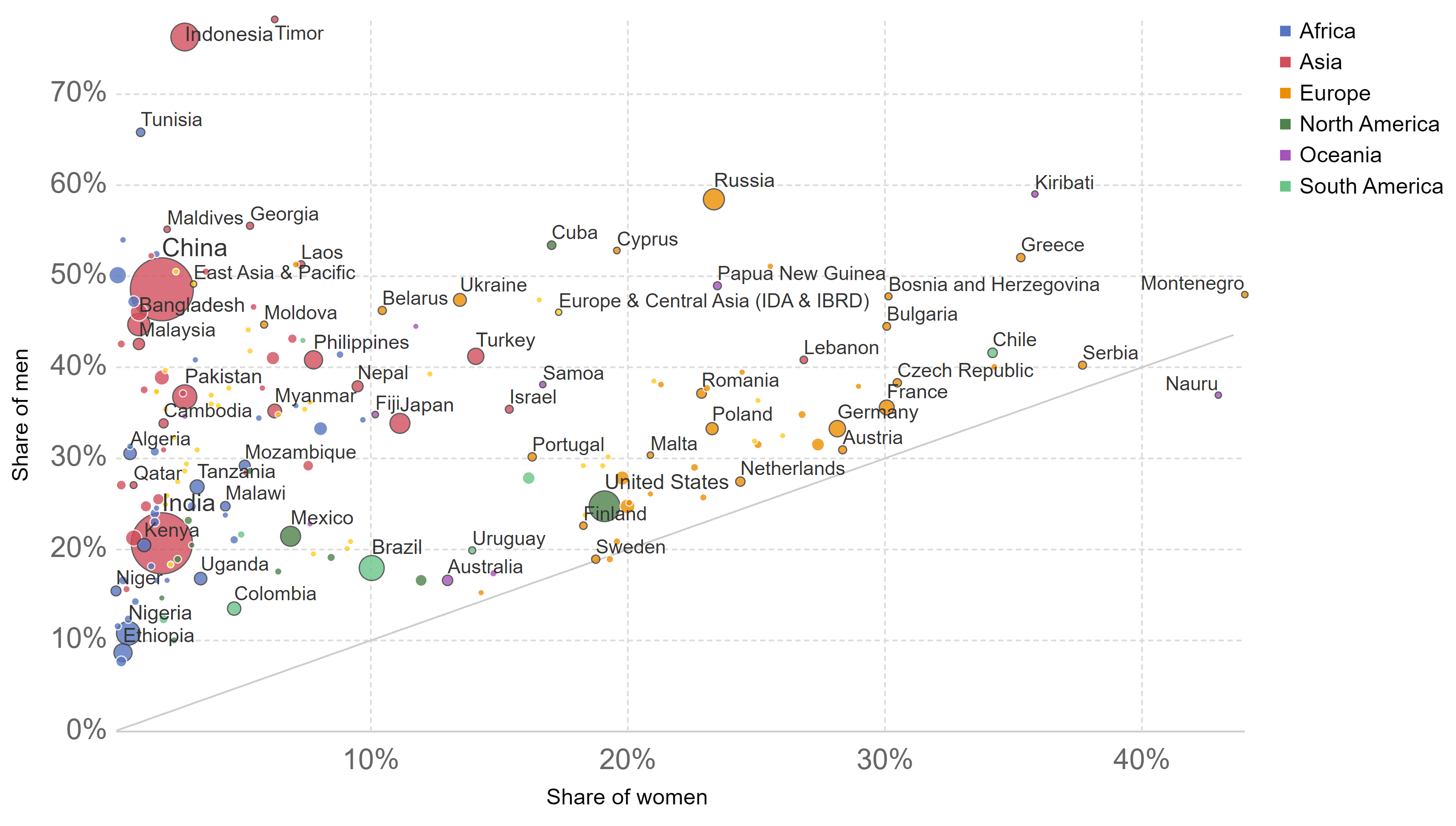
Share of men versus women who smoke in 2016

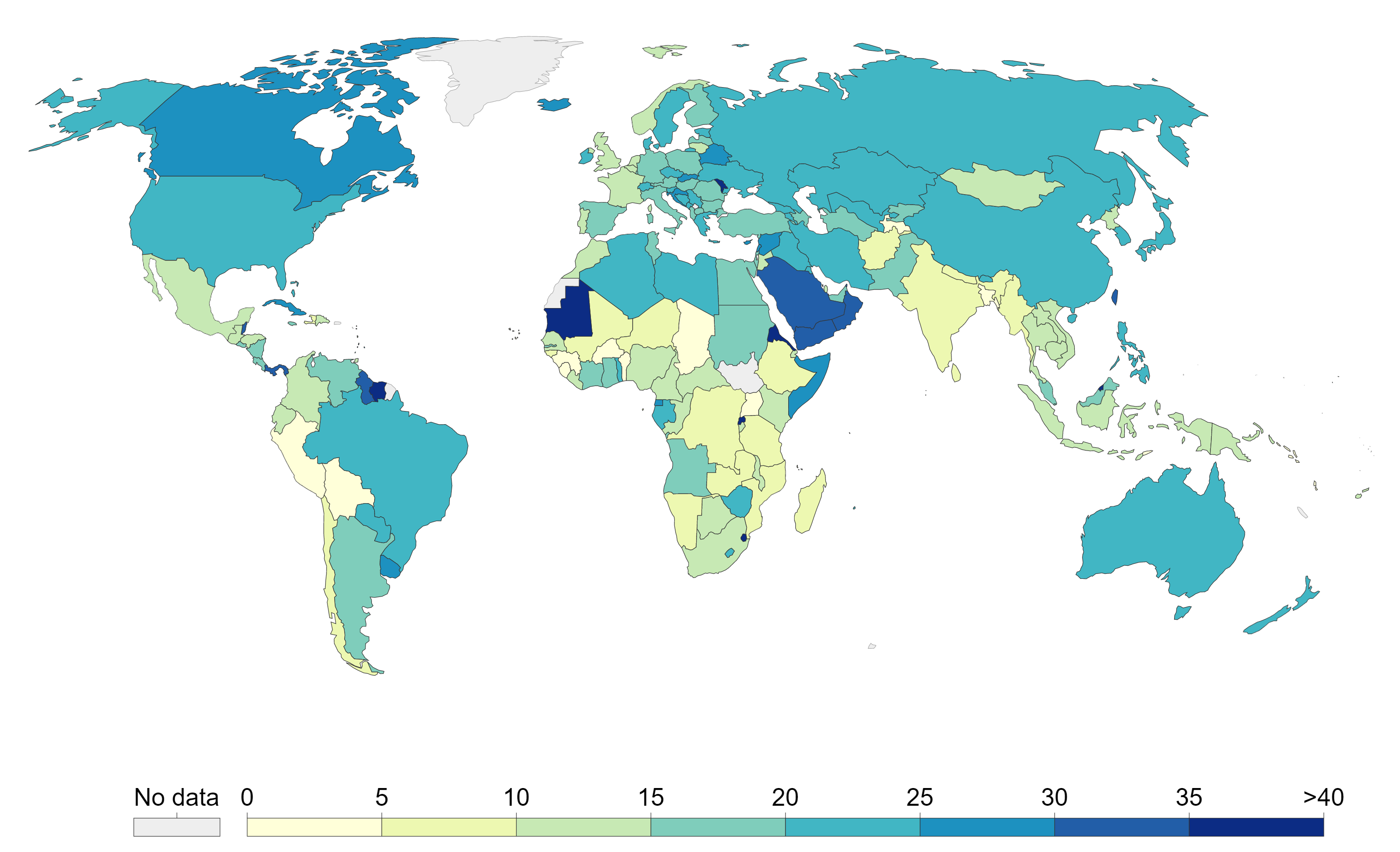
Consumption per smoker per day in 2012

Percentages of smoking adult population in Finland, Norway, USA, Japan and the Netherlands in 2011

=== Australia ===
In the 20th century, smoking was common. There were social events like the smoke night which promoted the habit. In Australia the prevalence of smoking is in decline, with figures from the 2011-12 Australian Health Survey showing 18% of the population to be current smokers, a decline from 28% in 1989–90.

Among the indigenous population, the rate was much higher: 50% of men and 44% of women reported being current smokers in 2007–08.

People aged 25 to 34 were the most likely to smoke (24%), with a marked decline in smoking rates as age increased past 45 years in 2011–12.

In 2007–08, the prevalence of smoking was strongly associated with socioeconomic disadvantage: a greater proportion of men (33%) and women (26%) who live in the most disadvantaged 20% of areas were current smokers than those who live in the least disadvantaged 20% of areas (12% and 11% respectively).

In 2016, the daily smoking rate was less than 13%. By 2022, this number had fallen to 10.6% in Australian adults.

=== Brazil ===
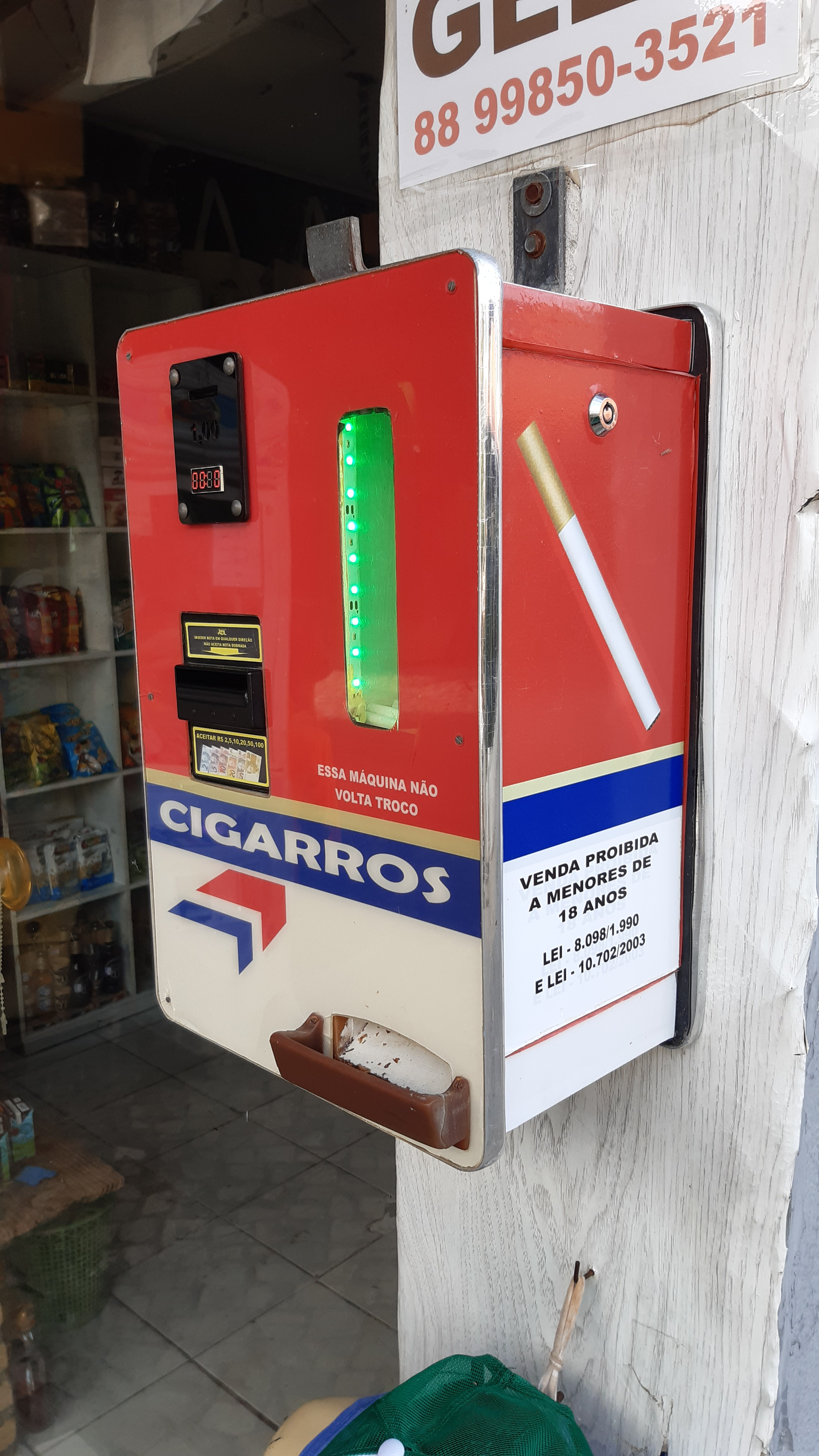
A cigarette dispenser in Canoa Quebrada, Brazil selling individual cigarettes for R$1 in 2024

Smoking rates in Brazil have been falling substantially since the 1980s. According to data from Vigitel, 9.3% of Brazilian adults smoked in 2023, compared to 34.8% in 1989. This decline reflects decades of public health campaigns and legal restrictions.

In 2005, Brazil ratified the World Health Organization (WHO) Framework Convention on Tobacco Control, providing an international basis for its policies. In 2024, a slight increase to 11.6% was observed, highlighting challenges such as the use of e-cigarettes (banned since 2009). Smoking has a massive impact on health; in 2020, it was responsible for 161,853 deaths (13% of the total) and economic costs exceeding 125 billion reais.

Smoking is recognized as a risk factor for numerous diseases (cancers, cardiovascular diseases, chronic lung diseases, etc.). In the 1970s, medical and public health movements began to warn of these risks in Brazil.

Since then, public policies have drastically reduced consumption. Research shows that the prevalence of adult smokers fell from 34.8% in 1989 to 12.6% in 2019 and 9.3% in 2023. This decline occurred across all subgroups: in 2019, 15.9% of men and 9.6% of women smoked. Smoking among young people is also low. The 2019 National School Health Survey (PeNSE) reported 6.8% of smokers among students aged 13–17.

=== Canada ===
In December 2002, Statistics Canada published a report on smoking prevalence from 1985 to 2001. In that report, they found from 1985 to 1991, the prevalence of "current smoking" (which they defined as daily smokers and occasional smokers) declined overall, for both sexes and all age groups except for those aged 15 to 24. Even larger declines occurred from 1991 to 2001. While current smoking prevalence for youths did not significantly change from 1985 to 1994–1995, there was a significant decrease of 6 percentage points from 1994–1995 to 2001 (from 28.5% to 22.5%). Provincially, Newfoundland and Labrador, Nova Scotia, Quebec, Ontario, Saskatchewan, Alberta and British Columbia, experienced most of their declines in current smoking prevalence from 1994 to 1995 onwards. All provinces experienced some level of decline from 1985 to 2001. Declines in daily smoking prevalence occurred for both sexes and all age groups over the 17 years, although youth smoking did not start significantly declining until the mid-1990s. Overall, for daily cigarette consumption, smokers by 2001 had a significantly lower proportion of smoking 26 or more cigarettes daily compared with 1985 (14.0% to 5.8%). Most of the declines in the different sex or age groups occurred after 1991. At the same time, smokers in 2001 had a higher proportion of smoking 1 to 10 cigarettes daily compared with 1985 (18.6% to 31.1%). Most of the decline occurred after 1991. As of 2008 the rate was estimated to be 18%, and declining. A 2011 survey estimates that 17% of Canadians smoke.

=== Germany ===
In 2005, 27% of the population admitted to being current smokers. 23% were daily smokers (28% of men and 19% of women) while 4% smoked occasionally. The highest ratio of daily smokers was in the 20-24 age group: 38% of men and 30% of women. According to a 2010 study by Bielefeld University, 9.9% of all 15-year-old males and 10.8% of 15-year-old females smoked daily, which showed a strong decline during the previous decade.

As in other industrial countries, the prevalence of smoking in Germany is lower among people with a higher education level.

A 2009 comparative study found that 25.1% of male and 20.6% of female medical students in Göttingen smoked, while in London the percentages were only 10.9% and 9.1%.

Germany had the largest number of cigarette vending machines per capita in the world: 1 per 102.5 people.

=== Israel ===
In Israel, smoking prevalence among males had remained relatively constant at 30% in the years 1994–2004. Among females the prevalence has declined slightly from 25% in 1998 to 18% in 2003. For the youth, 14% smoked at least once per week, according to a 2001 publication.

In 2005, research has shown that Israeli youths have begun to use bidis and hookah, as alternative methods of tobacco use. In 1990, smoking was the cause of about 1,800 male deaths in Israel which was around 12% of all male deaths. Smoking is not significant cause of death among Israeli women. The average number of cigarettes smoked per Israeli stands at 2162 (6).

There are several anti-tobacco use legislations in effect. For instance, advertising is prohibited in youth publications and is forbidden on television and radio, in addition to substantial increases in tobacco taxes, although the prices are still among the lowest compared to all of the European countries. In addition, until 2004, there was no minimum age requirement for buying tobacco products in Israel; however, an amendment to the tobacco marketing and advertisement law that became effective at 2004 has limited the sale of tobacco to people above the age of 18.

According to Israel Central Bureau of Statistics, the smoking rate in the Israeli adult population in 2009 was 20.9%, down from 34% in 2000. A Ministry of Health nationwide survey conducted in 2011 found that 20.6% of the population aged 21 and older were smokers. The highest percentage of smokers was among Arab males, 44% percent of whom smoked, though this figure is down from 50% in 1996.

=== New Zealand ===
Tobacco consumption in New Zealand peaked in the mid-1970s when 60% of the population were smokers. By 2011, that number had fallen to 20% of the population, due to stringent tobacco control laws which are amongst the world's strictest. However, despite these laws, the number of smokers appears to be increasing as the global economy worsens and a recent spate of natural disasters has seen an increase in tobacco sales, and although more males smoke than females, this gap is slowly narrowing. Tobacco consumption by Māori remains disproportionately high despite having decreased over recent years, as a result of television, internet, radio, and print media anti-smoking advertising aimed at Māori. There has, however, been a correspondingly large increase in vaping, particularly among younger demographics.

=== Romania ===
According to the Romanian Ministry of Health, the smoking rate among the general population declined from 36% in 2004 to 26% in 2011. A report commissioned in 2012 revealed that 34.9% of men smoked daily, compared to 14.5% of women, and in the preceding 12 months, 37.8% of regular smokers had attempted to quit at least once. Despite a general decline in smoking prevalence, the rate among women nearly doubled from 1991 to 2011, with 55% of women smokers belonging to the 15–34 age group.

=== Spain ===
According to the 2017 National Health Survey 22.1% of the population above the age of 15 reports smoking daily, 2.3% declares smoking occasionally, 24.9% reports being ex-smokers, and 50.7% never smoked. The survey also revealed that 25.6% of men smoked, compared to 18.8% of women. The historical data series shows that the rate in Spain has fallen more than 10 points from 1993 to 2017, from 44% to 25.6% for men and from 20.8% to 18.8% for women. However, since 2014, the trend has slowed, with just less than 1 point improvement, from 23% to 22.1%.

=== Sweden ===
Swedish citizens, 16 years or older, that consumed snus or smoking tobacco on a daily basis in 2011

The first research on smoking in Sweden was performed in 1946; it showed that 50% of men and 9% of women were smokers. In 1977 41% of men and 32% of women were smokers. By 2011, the use of smoking tobacco daily had decreased to only 12.5% among men and 14.3% among women. The use of snus, daily among men older than 15 years, was approximately 19.4% and only 3.0% for women.

=== United Kingdom ===
The Health Survey for England in 2002 found a smoking rate of 26%. By 2007 the proportion of adult smokers in England had declined four percentage points to 22%. In 2015, it was reported smoking rates in England had fallen to 16.9%, a record low. The rate in England had fallen to 14.4% in 2018.

Overall, the number of smokers in the UK in 2007 was estimated at 13.7 million. In 2007 the rate of smoking amongst the most socioeconomically affluent patients was 14%, compared to 34% for the most deprived. Figures from 2024 show that the proportion of the British population (UK excluding Northern Ireland) who smoke has fallen to 10.6%.

=== United States ===
Cigarette smoking in the U.S. has declined by about two-thirds over the past half-century.

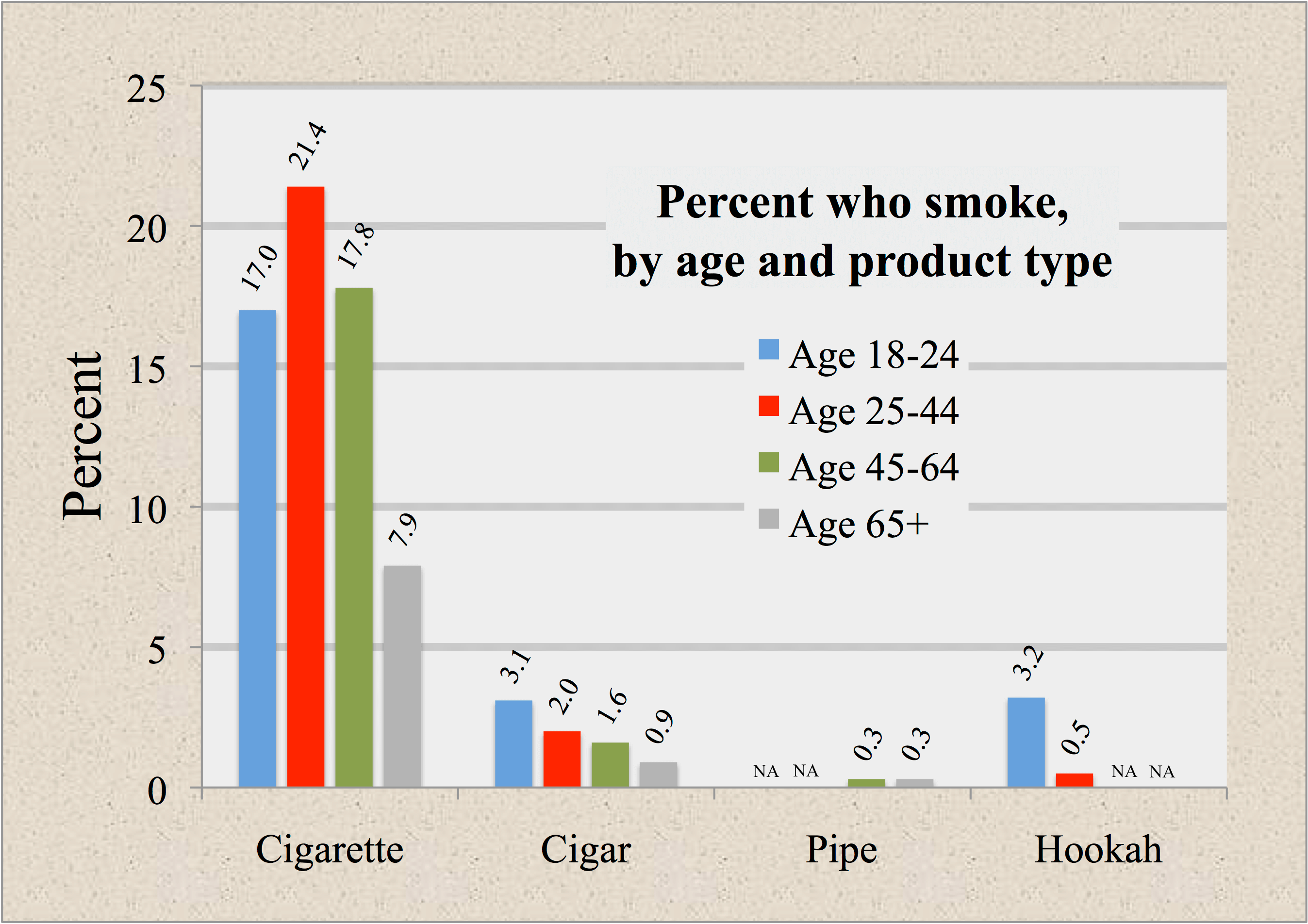
Adult tobacco use by age (2013-2014 survey)

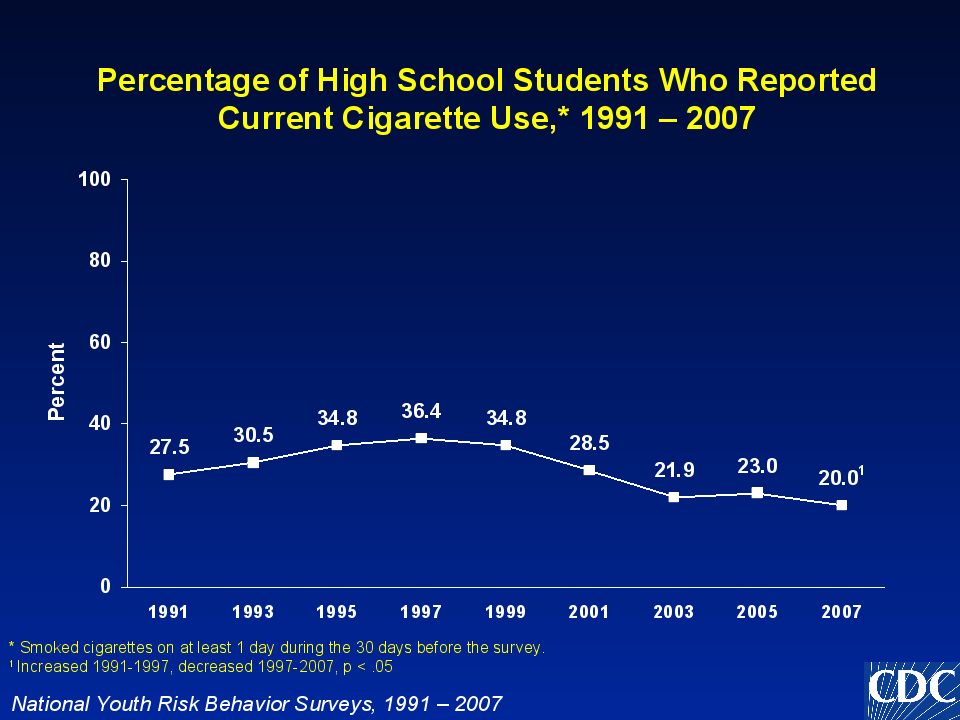
High school student cigarette use (1991–2007)

As of 2022, a total of 11.2% of U.S. adults (11.7% of men and 10.8% of women) were regular smokers. This was a considerable drop from 2005, when 23.9% of men and 18.1% of women were reported to be current smokers. Among racial and ethnic groups in 2005, Native Americans and Alaska Natives had the highest smoking rates, at 32.0%; they were followed by non-Hispanic whites at 21.9%, and non-Hispanic blacks at 21.5%. Hispanics at 16.2%, and Asians at 13.3%, had the lowest rates of smoking.

Based on educational level in 2005, the percentage of U.S. adult smokers was highest among those who had earned a high school diploma or its GED equivalent, at 43.2%. Among Americans with less education (9 to 11 years), the percentage of smokers was 32.6%. The prevalence of tobacco use was generally lower among those with higher levels of education. Excluding educational attainment, the highest prevalence of smoking in the U.S. was among adults aged 18–24 years (24.4%) and 25–44 years (24.1%). Rates of smoking were also higher among adults living below the U.S. federal poverty line (29.9%) than among those at or above the poverty line (20.6%).

In November 2015, a Centers for Disease Control and Prevention (CDC) report noted that "the percentage of U.S. adults who smoke cigarettes had already declined from 20.9 percent in 2005 to 16.8 percent in 2014. Cigarette smoking was significantly lower in 2014 (16.8 percent) than in 2013 (17.8 percent)." The CDC concluded this from data obtained by a survey of Americans. In 2017, researchers reported that they were unsure if products like e-cigarettes were in any way helpful in reducing smoking in the country. They added that some 4,000 minors in the U.S. start smoking every day.

== See also ==
- List of tobacco-related topics
- Tobacco control
