= Tobacco control =

Field of health science

Enforcement of bans on tobacco advertising

Tobacco control is a field of international public health science, policy and practice dedicated to addressing tobacco use and thereby reducing the morbidity and mortality it causes. Since most cigarettes and cigars and hookahs contain or use tobacco, tobacco control also addresses these products. Tobacco control is a priority area for the World Health Organization (WHO) as a part of the Framework Convention on Tobacco Control. References to a tobacco control movement may have either positive or negative connotations, depending upon the commentator.

Tobacco control aims to reduce the prevalence of tobacco and nicotine use and this is measured with the "age-standardized prevalence of current tobacco use among persons aged 15 years and older". E-cigarettes do not contain tobacco itself, but often contain nicotine, and are thus often are considered within the context of tobacco control.

== Connotations ==
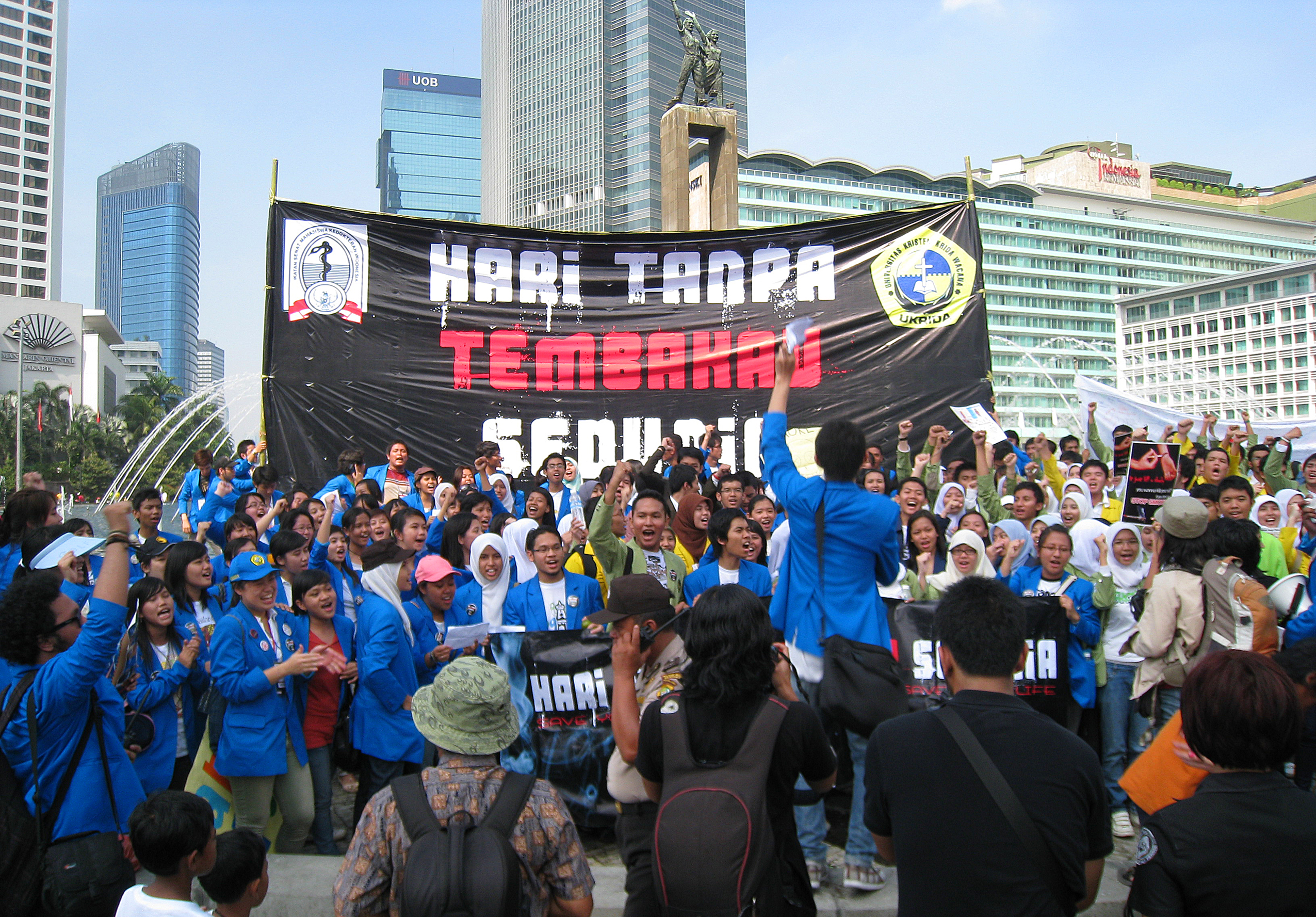
Medical students in Jakarta demonstrate against tobacco a day before World No Tobacco Day, at Bundaran Hotel Indonesia, Central Jakarta, Indonesia. May 30, 2010.

The tobacco control field comprises the activity of disparate health, policy and legal research and reform advocacy bodies across the world. These took time to coalesce into a sufficiently organised coalition to advance such measures as the World Health Organization Framework Convention on Tobacco Control, and the first article of the first edition of the Tobacco Control journal suggested that developing as a diffusely organised movement was indeed necessary in order to bring about effective action to address the health effects of tobacco use.

The tobacco control movement has also been referred to as an anti-smoking movement by some who disagree with its aims, as documented in internal tobacco industry memoranda.

== Early history ==
The first attempts to prohibit the use of tobacco followed soon after the introduction of tobacco to Europe. Pope Urban VII's thirteen-day papal reign included the world's first known tobacco use restrictions in 1590 when he threatened to excommunicate anyone who "took tobacco in the porchway of or inside a church, whether it be by chewing it, smoking it with a pipe or sniffing it in powdered form through the nose". In this restriction, tobacco was sentenced to excommunication, not so much because it harmed health, but because its use within the Churches was intolerable because it ruined the atmosphere of the masses. Thus, these sentences would not be made against tobacco per se (whose individual consumption was not penalized as long as it was moderate), but rather for its improper use in places considered sacred and public. The condemnation of improper use remains intact in Catholic doctrine today.

The earliest citywide European smoking restrictions were enacted in Bavaria, Kursachsen, and certain parts of Austria in the late 17th century.

In Britain, the still-new habit of smoking met royal opposition in 1604, when King James I wrote A Counterblaste to Tobacco, describing smoking as: "A custome loathsome to the eye, hateful to the nose, harmeful to the brain, dangerous to the lungs, and in the black stinking fume thereof, nearest resembling the horrible Stigian smoke of the pit that is bottomeless." His commentary was accompanied by a doctor of the same period, writing under the pseudonym "Philaretes", who as well as explaining tobacco's harmful effects under the system of the four humours ascribed an infernal motive to its introduction, explaining his dislike of tobacco as grounded upon eight 'principal reasons and arguments' (in their original spelling):

1. First, that in their use and custom, no method or order is observed. Diversitie and distinction of persons, times and seasons considered.
2. Secondly, for that it is in qualitie and complexion more hot and drye then may be conveniently used dayly of any man: much lesse of the hot and cholerique constitution.
3. Thirdly, for that it is experimented and tried to be a most strong and violent purge.
4. Fourthly, for that it witherete and drieth up naturall moisture in our bodies, thereby causing sterrilitie and barrennesses: In which respect it seemeth an enemy to the continuance and propagacion of mankinde.
5. Fiftly, for that it decayeth and dissipateh naturall heate, that kindly warmeth in us, and thereby is cause of crudities and rewmes, occasions of infinite maladies.
6. Sixtly, for that this herb is rather weeed, seemethe not voide of venome and poison, and thereby seemeth an enemy to the lyfe of man.
7. Seaventhly, for that the first author and finder hereof was the Divell, and the first practisers of the same were the Divells Preiests, and therefore not to be used of us Christians.
8. Last of all, because it is a great augmentor of all sorts of melancholie in our bodies, a humor fit to prepare our bodies to receave the prestigations and hellih illusions and impressions of the Divell himselfe: in so much that many Phisitions and learned mean doe hold this humour to be the verie seate of the Divell in bodies possessed.

Later in the seventeenth century, Sir Francis Bacon identified the addictive consequences of tobacco use, observing that it "is growing greatly and conquers men with a certain secret pleasure, so that those who have once become accustomed thereto can later hardly be restrained therefrom".

Smoking was forbidden in Berlin in 1723, in Königsberg in 1742, and in Stettin in 1744. These restrictions were repealed in the revolutions of 1848. In 1930s Germany, scientific research for the first time revealed a connection between lung cancer and smoking, so the use of cigarettes and smoking was strongly discouraged by a heavy government sponsored anti-smoking campaign.

== Modern origins ==
Cover of the 1964 Smoking and Health report

After the Second World War, German research was effectively silenced due to perceived associations with Nazism. However, the work of Richard Doll in the UK, who conclusively identified the causal link between smoking and lung cancer in 1952, brought this topic back to public attention. Partial controls and regulatory measures eventually followed in much of the developed world, including partial advertising bans, minimum age of sale requirements, and basic health warnings on tobacco packaging. However, smoking prevalence and associated health issues continued to rise in the developed world in the first three decades following Richard Doll's discovery, with governments sometimes reluctant to curtail a habit seen as socially acceptable, as a result - and increasingly organised disinformation efforts by the tobacco industry and their proxies (covered in more detail below). Realisation dawned gradually that the health effects of smoking and tobacco use were susceptible only to a multi-pronged policy response which combined positive health messages with medical assistance to cease tobacco use and effective marketing restrictions, as initially indicated in a 1962 overview by the British Royal College of Physicians and the 1964 report of the U.S. Surgeon General.

In the United States, the 1964 report of the Advisory Committee to the Surgeon General represented a landmark document that included an objective synthesis of the evidence of the health consequences of smoking according to causal criteria. The report concluded that cigarette smoking was a cause of lung cancer in men and sufficient in scope that "remedial action" was warranted at the societal level. The Surgeon General's report process is an enduring example of evidence-based public health in practice.

== Comprehensive tobacco control ==
=== At the global level ===
The WHO Framework Convention on Tobacco Control has been ratified by 182 countries (in orange), representing over 90% of the world's population.

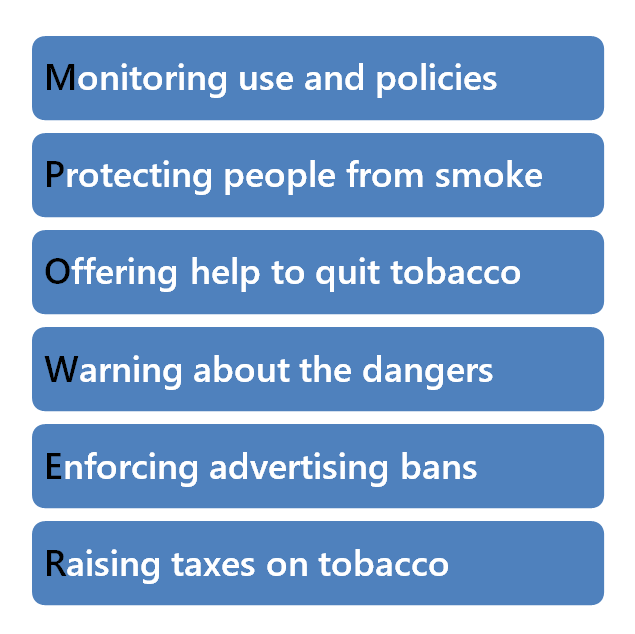
The MPOWER policy package of effective interventions for tobacco control

The concept of multi-pronged and therefore 'comprehensive' tobacco control arose through academic advances (e.g., the dedicated Tobacco Control journal), not-for-profit advocacy groups such as Action on Smoking and Health, and government policy initiatives. Progress was initially notable at a state or national level, particularly the pioneering smoke-free public places legislation introduced in New York City in 2002 and the Republic of Ireland in 2004, and the UK efforts to encapsulate the crucial elements of tobacco control activity in the 2004 'six-strand approach' (to deliver upon the joined-up approach set out in the white paper 'Smoking Kills') and its local equivalent, the 'seven hexagons of tobacco control'. This broadly organised set of health research and policy development bodies then formed the Framework Convention Alliance to negotiate and support the first international public health treaty, the World Health Organization Framework Convention on Tobacco Control (FCTC).

The FCTC compels signatories to advance activity on the full range of tobacco control fronts, including limiting interactions between legislators and the tobacco industry, imposing taxes upon tobacco products and carrying out demand reduction, protecting people from exposure to second-hand smoke in indoor workplaces and public places through smoking bans, regulating and disclosing the contents and emissions of tobacco products, posting highly visible health warnings upon tobacco packaging, removing deceptive labelling (e.g. 'light' or 'mild'), improving public awareness of the consequences of smoking, prohibiting all tobacco advertising, provision of cessation programmes, effective counter-measures to smuggling of tobacco products, restriction of sales to minors and relevant research and information-sharing among the signatories.

WHO subsequently produced an internationally applicable and now widely recognized summary of the essential elements of tobacco control strategy, publicized as the mnemonic MPOWER tobacco control strategy. The six components are:

- Monitor tobacco use and prevention policies
- Protect people from tobacco smoke
- Offer help to quit tobacco use
- Warn about the dangers of tobacco
- Enforce bans on tobacco advertising, promotion, and sponsorship
- Raise taxes on tobacco

One of the targets of the Sustainable Development Goal 3 of the United Nations (to be achieved by 2030) is to "Strengthen the implementation of the World Health Organization Framework Convention on Tobacco Control in all countries, as appropriate." The indicator that is used to measure progress is the "age-standardized prevalence of current tobacco use among persons aged 15 years and older".

The number of tobacco users worldwide fell from about 1.38 billion in 2000 to 1.2 billion in 2024. A reduction of 120 million users was estimated since 2010 which is a 27% drop in relative terms. Approximately one in five adults globally still uses tobacco.

The pace and burden of decline varies a lot between WHO regions. The 2025 WHO trends report found that Africa has the lowest adult tobacco use prevalence at about 9.5% in 2024, while Europe has the highest at an estimated 24.1%, including the highest prevalence among women at about 17.4%. The African, American and South East Asian regions are on track to reach the 30% target by 2025.

In the WHO South-East Asia Region, once the global hotspot for smoking, tobacco use among men has almost halved, with estimated prevalence declining from about 70% in 2000 to 37% in 2024. This region alone is responsible for more than half of the global decline in tobacco users.

The 2025 WHO report estimated that more than 100 million people worldwide currently use electronic cigarettes or other electronic nicotine products.

Tobacco companies say that the rapid growth in non-combustible nicotine products and the associated decline in the consumption of combustible tobacco products would be in line with their goal of reducing traditional tobacco consumption through vaping.

In 2003, India passed the Cigarettes and Other Tobacco Products (Prohibition of Advertisement and Regulation of Trade and Commerce, Production, Supply and Distribution) Act, 2003, which restricted advertisement of tobacco products, banned smoking in public places, and placed other regulations on the trade of tobacco products. In 2010, Bhutan, passed the Tobacco Control Act of Bhutan 2010 to regulate tobacco and tobacco products, banning the cultivation, harvesting, production, and sale of tobacco and tobacco products in Bhutan; and the Hindi-language anti-smoking short film Swing is released.

In the United States, adult cigarette smoking prevalence has reached its lowest level in six decades. The data indicates that cigarette smoking among adults declined from approximately 42.4% in 1965 to 11.6% in 2022, reflecting large sustained reductions in combustible tobacco use.

Analyses of earlier U.S. survey data similarly found that approximately four out of five adult tobacco users used combustible products. In 2019, about 80.5% of current adult tobacco users reported using combustible tobacco products, and in more recent analyses approximately 79.6% of adult tobacco users reported combustible use, underlining that combustibles still dominate adult tobacco consumption despite long-term declines.

A separate report on U.S. adults estimated that approximately 19,8% of adults used any tobacco product in 2022, 14.6% who used combustible products including 11.6% who smoked cigarettes, with most adult tobacco users still using at least one combustible product.

Further analysis of data from 2017 to 2023 showed that the prevalence of adults who exclusively smoke cigarettes declined from 10.8% to 7.9%, while at the same time an increase in exclusive e-cigarette use from 1.2% to 4.1% was noted.

=== Policies ===
==== Taxation ====
Scientific evidence shows that significantly increasing taxation and price of tobacco products is the most effective tool for reducing tobacco use.

==== Age restriction ====
Tobacco policies that limit the sale of cigarettes to minors and restrict smoking in public places are important strategies to deter youth from accessing and consuming cigarettes. Recent data show substantial declines in youth tobacco use between 2023 and 2024. The current use of any tobacco product fell from 12.6% to 10.1% of middle and high school students, largely driven by a decline in high school e-cigarette use from 10.0% to 7.8%, and reaching the lowest overall youth tobacco use level recorded by the survey. Amongst youth in the United States, for example, when compared with students living in states with strict regulations, young adolescents living in states with no or minimal restrictions, particularly high school students, were more likely to be daily smokers. These effects were reduced when logistic regressions were adjusted for sociodemographic characteristics and cigarette price, suggesting that higher cigarette prices may discourage youth to access and consume cigarettes independent of other tobacco control measures.

==== Tobacco free generation ====
Tobacco-free generation policies or generational smoking bans are bans on selling combustible cigarettes to people born after a certain year. Part of tobacco control or tobacco endgame, apart from the Maldives they only ban sales of combustible tobacco products, such as cigarettes which burn not ecigs.

The Maldives was the first country to do so, followed by the UK. And other places, such as Turkey, Canada and parts of the United States, are considering such a smoke-free generation policy. The EU cannot do so as a bloc because health policy is decided by individual countries, such as Ireland.

==== Graphic warning labels ====
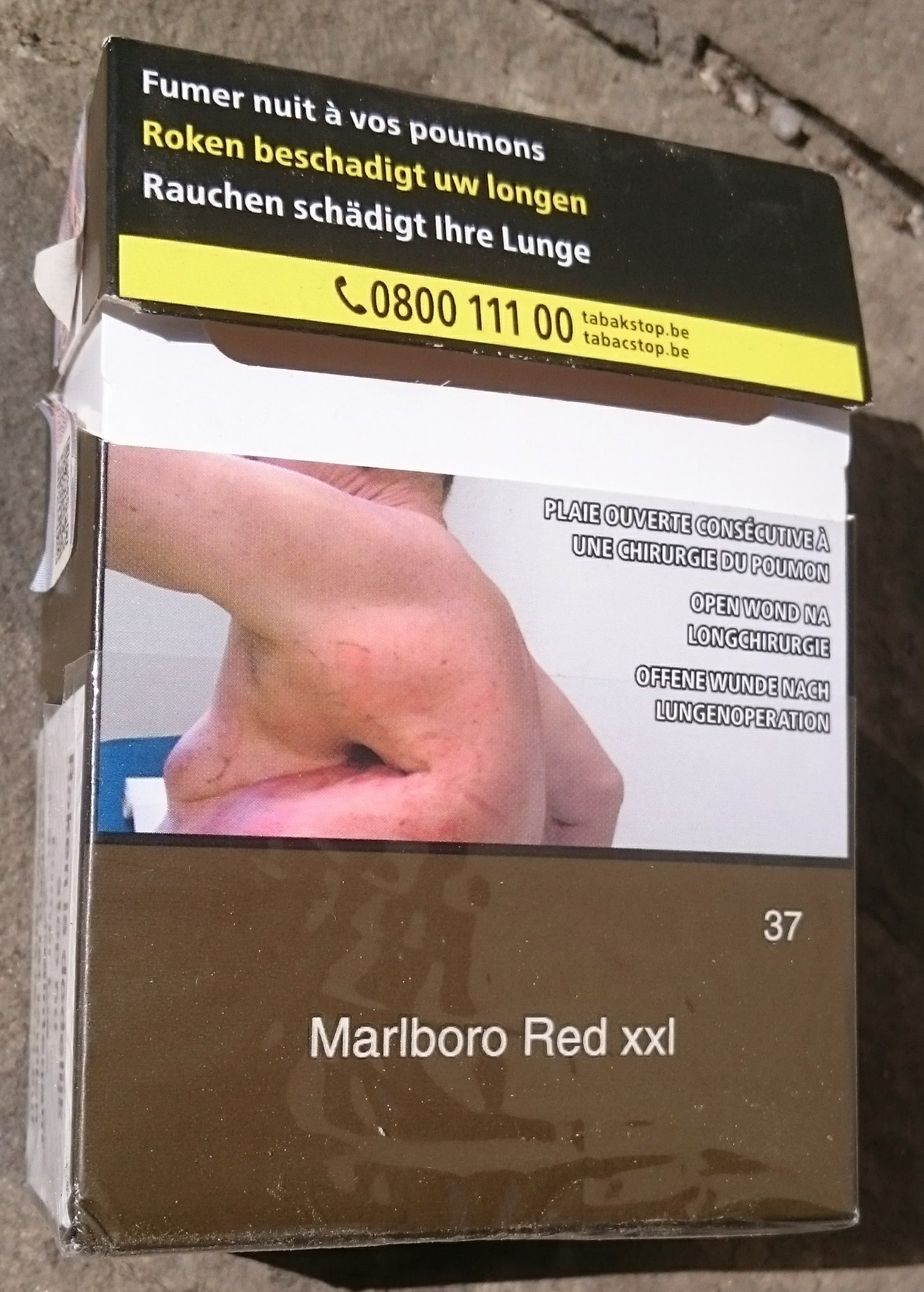
Example of plain tobacco packaging, without brand logo or colour, in Belgium

Some smokers are not fully informed about the risks of smoking. Tobacco packaging warning messages which are graphic, larger, and more comprehensive in content are more effective in communicating health risks and knowledge about smoking. Smokers who noticed the warnings were significantly more likely to endorse health risks, including lung cancer and heart disease. In each instance where labelling policies differed between countries, smokers living in countries with government mandated warnings reported greater health knowledge.

Graphic warning labels on cigarette packs are noticed by the majority of adolescents, increase adolescents' cognitive processing of these messages and have the potential to lower smoking intentions. The introduction of graphic warning labels has greatly reduced smoking among adolescents.

==== Smoke-free public places ====
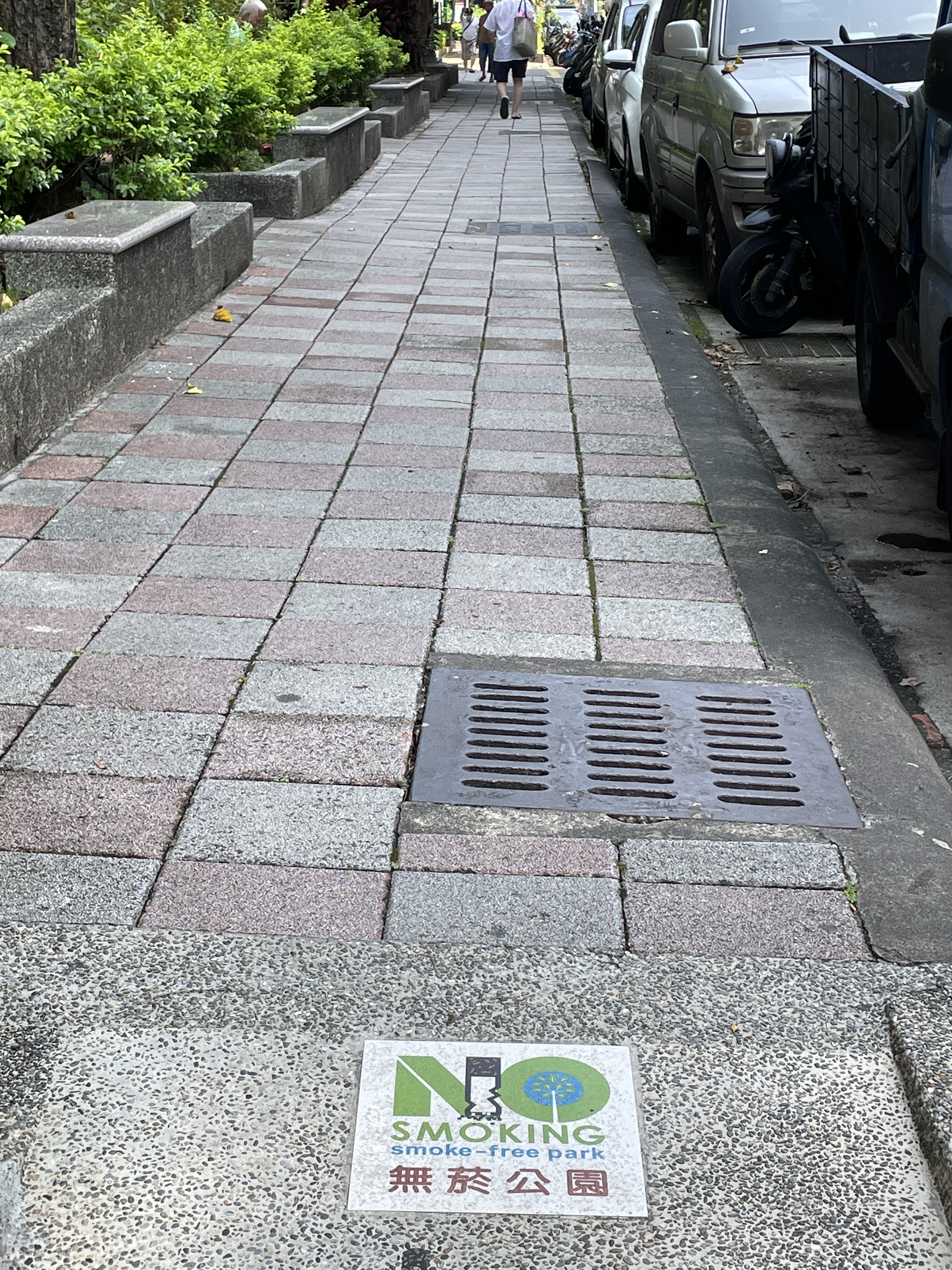
A "No smoking" sign painted on the pavement leading to a small community park in Taiwan

Smoking in indoor workplaces was first prohibited nationwide by the Republic of Ireland in 2004, with most other leading economies following suit with similar ordinances in subsequent years.

==== Smoking cessation ====
Smoking cessation services borrow from the methodologies of other addiction recovery interventions to assist smokers to quit. As well as reducing morbidity and mortality for individual patients, these have been repeatedly found to reduce the overall cost to health systems of treating smoking-related disease.

== Reception and further international collaboration ==
Now an accepted element of the public health arena, tobacco control policies and activity are seen to have been effective in those administrations which have implemented them in a co-ordinated fashion.

The tobacco control community is internationally organised – as is its main opponent, the tobacco industry (sometimes referred to as 'Big Tobacco'). This allows for the sharing of effective practice (both in advocacy and policy) between developed and developing states, for instance, through the World Conference on Tobacco or Health held every three years. However, some significant gaps remain, particularly the failure of the US and Switzerland (both bases for international tobacco companies and, in the former case, a tobacco producer) to ratify the FCTC.

=== Journal ===
Tobacco Control is also the name of a journal published by BMJ Group (the publisher of the British Medical Journal) which studies the nature and implications of tobacco use and the effect of tobacco use upon health, the economy, the environment and society. Edited by Ruth Malone, Professor and chair, Department of Social & Behavioral Sciences, University of California, San Francisco, it was first published in 1992.

== Opposition ==
Direct and indirect opposition from the tobacco industry continues, for instance through the tobacco industry's efforts at misinformation via suborned scientists and 'astroturf' counter-advocacy operations such as FOREST.

== See also ==
- List of tobacco-related topics
- Action on Smoking and Health
- Anti-Cigarette League of America
- Anti-tobacco movement in Nazi Germany
- List of cigarette smoke carcinogens
- List of smoking bans
- List of tobacco products
- National Non-Smoking Week
- Patrick Reynolds, an anti-smoking activist
- Philip Morris v. Uruguay
- Plain tobacco packaging
- Smoking age
- Smoking ban
- Smoking bans in private vehicles
- Terrie Hall (1960 – 2013), anti-smoking activist who died from smoking
- Tobacco advertising
- Tobacco Control
- Tobacco packaging warning messages
- Tobacco politics
- Tobacco-Free College Campuses
- Tobacco-Free Pharmacies
- Vaping
- WHO Framework Convention on Tobacco Control
- Word of Wisdom
- World No Tobacco Day

== Bibliography ==
- Chapman, Simon (2007). Public Health Advocacy and Tobacco Control: Making Smoking History. Wiley-Blackwell. ISBN 9781405161633.
- Tate, Cassandra. Cigarette wars: the triumph of" the little white slaver" (Oxford University Press, USA, 2000) online.
- Young, T. Kue (2005). Population Health: Concepts and Methods. Oxford University Press. ISBN 0-19-515854-7.
