= American Association of Public Health Physicians =

The American Association of Public Health Physicians (AAPHP), is a professional association of public health physicians. Its motto is "the voice of Public Health Physicians / Guardians of the Public's Health".

== History ==
AAPHP was founded in 1954 and was incorporated in Texas. Its initial purpose was to serve as the voice of physician directors of state and local health departments at the national level. Since its inception, AAPHP has been recognized by the American Medical Association as a medical specialty society, with formal representation in the AMA House of Delegates.

== Objectives ==
AAPHP's objectives now include advocacy on behalf of all public health physicians and Health Officers, whether employed in public or private settings, or academia. Current collaborations include National Commission on Correctional Health Care (NCCHC), One Health and NextGenU. Current major issues include tobacco control, injury prevention, public health surveillance, disease control, correctional (prison/jail) health, policy and management training, workforce issues, and issues pertaining to access to health care, health equity, health disparities, cultural competence and preventive services.

== Notes ==
- Resolutions of the AMA House of Delegates, 1989–2009 search AMA website
- AAPHP Contact information at AAPHP website
