= History of tobacco minimum purchase age by U.S. jurisdiction =

Minimum age to purchase tobacco in North America as of July 2026: Minimum age is 21 Minimum age is 19 Minimum age is 18

The minimum purchasing age for tobacco in the United States before December 20, 2019 varied by state and territory. Since December 20, 2019, the de jure purchase age in all states and territories is 21 under federal law which was passed by Congress and signed by President Donald Trump. The de facto minimum age remains 18 in six states: Alaska, Missouri, Montana, North Carolina, South Carolina, and Wisconsin.

== History ==
States that have passed their own Tobacco 21 laws either before or since the passage of the federal Tobacco 21 law (July 2026): States with their own Tobacco 21 laws that comply with federal law States without their own Tobacco 21 laws that are covered under federal law

Minimum age to purchase tobacco in the United States prior to the passage of the federal Tobacco 21 law: Minimum age was 21 Minimum age was 19 Minimum age was 18

Minimum age to purchase tobacco in the United States as of 1989: Minimum age was 19 Minimum age was 18 Minimum age was 17 Minimum age was 16 No minimum age

In the United States, laws regarding the minimum age to purchase and consume tobacco products have been made by states, territories, the District of Columbia and the federal government. Before 1992, states had the sole power to enforce their own minimum ages. These laws first appeared in the late 19th century, with New Jersey becoming the first state to set a minimum purchase age of 16 in 1883. By 1920, around half of states had their minimum purchase age of 21 and some simply prohibited "minors" (ages 14–24) from purchasing. During the 1920s, due to tobacco industry lobbying, the minimum ages were lowered across the U.S. and ranged from 16 to 19. By 1939, all states had age restrictions for tobacco. However, these laws kept changing throughout the 1950s, with Maryland repealing its age restrictions. The American Cancer Society recommended the minimum age of 18 in 1963, the American Medical Association recommended 21 in 1985, and the United States Department of Health and Human Services Office of the Inspector General recommended 19 or 21.

State tobacco laws partly changed in 1992 under the George H. W. Bush administration when Congress enacted the Alcohol, Drug Abuse, and Mental Health Administration Reorganization Act, whose Synar Amendment forced states to create their own laws to have a minimum age of 18 to purchase tobacco or else lose funding from the Substance Abuse and Mental Health Services Administration. The amendment was passed in response to the teenage smoking rates. All states raised their ages to either 18 or 19 by 1993. In 1997, the Food and Drug Administration enacted regulations making the federal minimum age 18, though later the U.S. Supreme Court terminated the FDA's jurisdiction over tobacco, ending its enforcement practices and leaving it up to states.

In 2009, the Family Smoking Prevention and Tobacco Control Act was enacted under the Barack Obama administration, once again setting a federal minimum age of 18 and prohibited the FDA from setting a higher minimum purchase age. From 1993 to 2012, the smoking age in all states was either 18 or 19. In 2005, the town of Needham, Massachusetts, became the first jurisdiction in the country to raise the minimum purchase age to 21. Between 2012 and 2015, local municipalities across the U.S. began raising their smoking ages to 21, with Hawaii becoming the first state to raise its age to 21 in 2015. This began the shift in states eventually raising their ages to 21 due to the teenage vaping epidemic. By 2019, 18 states and the District of Columbia had their minimum purchase ages at 21, 30 states had their ages at 18, and two had it at 19. On December 20, 2019, with the enactment of the Appropriations for Fiscal Year 2020 signed by President Donald Trump, the federal smoking age was raised to 21 by changing the minimum purchase age in the 1992 Synar Amendment. The United States Department of Defense followed, raising the age to purchase tobacco to 21 on military bases in the U.S. and abroad.

In 2024, the Massachusetts Supreme Judicial Court upheld a 2020 bylaw passed by the town of Brookline, which enforces a lifetime ban on the sale of tobacco products to anyone born on or after January 1, 2000, the first of its kind in the United States.

As of July 2026, twenty-six Massachusetts towns and cities, totaling over 695,000 people, have adopted Nicotine Free Generation regulations. These regulations prohibit the sale of nicotine products to people born after a specific date, such as those born after January 1, 2004. The communities include Amherst, Brookline, Belchertown, Chelsea, Concord, Conway, Dover, Easthampton, Hardwick, Hopkinton, Leverett, Malden, Manchester-by-the-Sea, Medfield, Melrose, Needham, Newton, Northampton, Pelham, Reading, Rockport, Somerville, Stoneham, South Hadley, Wakefield, and Winchester.

== Laws by state ==
State/territory	1883–1950: First MLAs enacted	1950–1970: Increased marketing towards youth	1970–1992: MLA reforms	1992–2009: Synar Amendment enacted	2009–2019: Tobacco Control Act enacted	2019–present: Tobacco 21 enacted	2020–present: Nicotine Free Generation enacted
Alabama	None (–1896)	21 (1896–1976)	19 (Note: The minimum legal age to purchase tobacco is aligned with Alabama's age of majority and was lowered from 21 to 19 in 1976.) (1976–2021)			21 (Note: Since 2019, the smoking age in Alabama has been 21 under federal law. State law raised the smoking age to 21 in 2021 to align federal and state law.) (2021–)	
Alaska	? (–1959)	18 (Note: The smoking age in Alaska was 18 upon joining the United States in 1959.) (1959–?); 16 (Note: The smoking age in Alaska was 16 in 1988.) (?–1988)	19 (Note: The smoking age in Alaska was raised from 16 to 19 sometime between 1988–2022. Since 2019, the smoking age in Alaska has been 21 under federal law. Under current state law, it is 19. In 2022, Governor Dunleavy vetoed a bill raising the smoking age.) (1988–)				
American Samoa	18 (Note: Since 2019, the smoking age in American Samoa has been 21 under federal law. Under current territorial law, it is 18.) (?–)						
Arizona	? (–1988)		18 (Note: The smoking age in Arizona was 18 in 1988.) (1988–2025)			21 (Note: Since 2019, the smoking age in Arizona has been 21 under federal law. Arizona raised the smoking age to 21 in 2025 to align with federal law.) (2025–)	
Arkansas	? (–1988)		18 (Note: The smoking age in Arkansas was 18 in 1988.) (1988–2019)		21 (Note: The smoking age was raised to 21 by the Arkansas General Assembly in 2019 three weeks prior to the federal Tobacco 21 law. It included a grandfather clause that exempted adults born before December 31, 2000. After the passage of the federal Tobacco 21 law, Governor Asa Hutchinson announced that Arkansas would be enforcing federal law which did not include a grandfather clause.) (2019–)		
California	16 (Note: The smoking age in California was 16 prior to 1911.) (?–1911)	18 (1911–2016)			21 (Note: The smoking age in California was raised from 18 to 21 in 2016 and it included an exemption for military personnel 18–20.) (2016–)		
Colorado	? (–1988)	None (Note: Colorado temporarily repealed its MLA in the 1960s and 70s.) (c. 1960s–70s)	18 (Note: The smoking age in Colorado was 18 in 1988.) (1970s–2020)			21 (Note: Since 2019, the smoking age in Colorado has been 21 under federal law. State law raised the smoking age to 21 in 2020 to align with federal law.) (2020–)	
Connecticut	None (–1902); 16 (1902–1987)		18 (1987–2019)		21 (Note: The smoking age was raised in Connecticut from 18 to 21 in 2019 two months prior to the passage of the federal Tobacco 21 law.) (2019–)		
Delaware	? (–1953)	17 (1953–1992)		18 (1992–2019)	21 (Note: The smoking age was raised in Delaware from 18 to 21 in 2019 seven months prior to the passage of the federal Tobacco 21 law.) (2019–)		
District of Columbia	16 (?–1990)		18 (1990–2016)		21 (2016–)		
Florida	? (–1988)		18 (Note: The smoking age in Florida was 18 in 1988.) (1988–2021)			21 (Note: Since 2019, the smoking age in Florida has been 21 under federal law. State law raised the smoking age to 21 in 2021 to align with federal law.) (2021–)	
Georgia	? (–1987)		17 (1987–1993)	18 (1993–2020)		21 (Note: Since 2019, the smoking age in Georgia has been 21 under federal law. State law raised the smoking age to 21 in 2020 to align with federal law.) (2020–)	
Guam	18 (?–2018)				21 (2018–)		
Hawaii	15 (Note: The smoking age in Hawaii was 15 in 1963.) (?–1988)		18 (Note: The smoking age in Hawaii was 18 in 1988.) (1988–2016)		21 (2016–)		
Idaho	18 (?–2022)					21 (Note: Since 2019, the smoking age in Idaho has been 21 under federal law. State law raised the smoking age to 21 in 2022 to align with federal law.) (2022–)	
Illinois	18 (?–2019)				21 (Note: The smoking age was raised by the Illinois General Assembly to 21 in 2019 five months prior to the federal Tobacco 21 law.) (2019–)		
Indiana	? (–1980)		16 (1980–1987); 18 (1987–2020)			21 (Note: Since 2019, the smoking age in Indiana has been 21 under federal law. State law raised the smoking age to 21 in 2020 to align with federal law.) (2020–)	
Iowa	16 (–1934); 21 (1934–1964)	18 (1964–)				21 (Note: Since 2019, the smoking age in Iowa has been 21 under federal law. State law raised the smoking age to 21 in 2020 to align with federal law.) (2020–)	
Kansas	? (–1988)		18 (Note: The smoking age in Kansas was 18 in 1988.) (1988–2023)			21 (Note: Since 2019, the smoking age in Kansas has been 21 under federal law. State law raised the smoking age to 21 in 2023 to align with federal law.) (2023–)	
Kentucky	None (–1990); 16 (1990–1992)			18 (1992–2020)		21 (Note: Since 2019, the smoking age in Kentucky has been 21 under federal law. State law raised the smoking age to 21 in 2020 to align with federal law.) (2020–)	
Louisiana	? (–1988)		None (1988–1991); 18 (1991–2021)			21 (Note: Since 2019, the smoking age in Louisiana has been 21 under federal law. State law raised the smoking age to 21 in 2021 to align with federal law.) (2021–)	
Maine	? (–1988)		18 (Note: The smoking age in Maine was 18 in 1988.) (1988–2018)		21 (2018–)		
Maryland	16 (–1989)			18 (1989–2019)	21 (Note: The smoking age was raised in Maryland from 18 to 21 in 2019 one month prior to the passage of the Tobacco 21 federal law. It included an exemption for military members 18–20.) (2019–)		
Massachusetts	? (–1988)		18 (Note: The smoking age in Massachusetts was 18 in 1988.) (1988–2018)		21 (2018–)		date-of-birth restriction in many municipalities
Michigan	? (–1988)		17 (Note: The smoking age in Michigan was 17 in 1988.) (?–1988); 18 (?–2019)			21 (Note: Since 2019, the smoking age in Michigan was 21 under federal law. State law raised the smoking age to 21 in 2020 to align with federal law.) (2020–)	
Minnesota	? (–1988)		18 (Note: The smoking age in Minnesota was 18 in 1988.) (?–2020)			21 (Note: Since 2019, the smoking age in Minnesota was 21 under federal law. State law raised the smoking age to 21 in 2020 to align with federal law.) (2020–)	
Mississippi	? (–1988)		18 (Note: The smoking age in Mississippi was 18 in 1988.) (?–2020)			21 (Note: Since 2019, the smoking age in Mississippi was 21 under federal law. State law raised the smoking age to 21 in 2020 to align with federal law.) (2020–)	
Missouri	? (–1988)		18 (Note: The smoking age in Missouri was 18 in 1988. Since 2019, the smoking age in Missouri has been 21. Under state law, it is 18.) (?–)				
Montana	None (–1993)			18 (Note: The smoking age in Montana was 18 in 1993. Since 2019, the smoking age in Montana has been 21 under federal law. Under current state law, it is 18.) (1993–)			
Nebraska	? (–1988)		18 (Note: The smoking age in Nebraska was 18 in 1988.) (1988–2019); 19 (Jan–Sep 2020)			21 (Note: Since 2019, the smoking age in Nebraska was 21 under federal law. State law raised the smoking age to 21 in 2020 to align with federal law.) (2020–)	
Nevada	? (–1988)		18 (Note: The smoking age in Nevada was 18 in 1988.) (1988–2021)			21 (Note: Since 2019, the smoking age in Nevada was 21 under federal law. State law raised the smoking age to 21 in 2021 to align with federal law.) (2021–)	
New Hampshire	? (–1988)		18 (Note: The smoking age in Nevada was 18 in 1988.) (1988–?); 19 (Note: The smoking age in New Hampshire was raised from 18 to 19 sometime between 1988–2020.) (?–2020)			21 (Note: Since 2019, the smoking age in New Hampshire was 21 under federal law. State law raised the smoking age to 21 in 2020 to align with federal law.) (2020–)	
New Jersey	None (–1883); 16 (Note: The smoking age in New Jersey was 16 in 1883 and in 1988.) (1883–1988)			18 (Note: The smoking age in New Jersey was raised from 16 to 18 sometime between 1998–2006.) (–2006); 19 (Note: The smoking age in New Jersey was raised from 18 to 19 in 2006.) (2006–2017)	21 (2017–)		
New Mexico	None (–1988)			18 (?–2020)		21 (Note: Since 2019, the smoking age in New Mexico was 21 under federal law. State law raised the smoking age to 21 in 2020 to align with federal law.) (2020–)	
New York	? (–1886); 16 (Note: The smoking age in New York was 16 in 1886.) (1886–?)		18 (Note: The smoking age in New York was raised from 16 to 18 sometime between 1886–1988.) (1988–2019)		21 (Note: The smoking age was raised to 21 by the New York State Legislature and signed by Governor Andrew Cuomo in 2019 five months prior to the federal Tobacco 21 law.) (2019–)		
North Carolina	? (–1988)		18 (Note: The smoking age in North Carolina was 18 in 1988. Since 2019, the smoking age in North Carolina has been 21 under federal law. Under current state law, it is 18. In 2020, some tobacco shops started to comply with federal law while others only complied with state law. An officer with the North Carolina Department of Public Safety described the conflicting laws: "We're in limbo trying to figure out what we can and cannot do," As of January 2026, North Carolina Alcohol Law Enforcement does not enforce the federal law; however, the Food and Drug Administration enforces the federal law in the state using its own compliance checks.) (1988–)				
North Dakota	? (–1988)		18 (Note: The smoking age in North Dakota was 18 in 1988.) (1988–2021)			21 (Note: Since 2019, the smoking age in North Dakota has been 21 under federal law. State law raised the smoking age to 21 in 2021 to align with federal law.) (2021–)	
Northern Mariana Islands	18 (Note: Since 2019, the smoking age in the Northern Mariana Islands has been 21 under federal law. Under current territorial law, it is 18.) (?–)						
Ohio	? (–1939); 18 (Note: The smoking age in Ohio was 18 in 1939.) (1939–2019)				21 (Note: The smoking age was raised to 21 by the Ohio General Assembly in 2019 five months prior to the federal Tobacco 21 law.) (2019–)		
Oklahoma	? (–1988)		18 (Note: The smoking age in Oklahoma was 18 in 1988.) (1988–2020)			21 (Note: Since 2019, the smoking age in Oklahoma has been 21 under federal law. State law raised the smoking age to 21 in 2020 to align with federal law.) (2020–)	
Oregon	None (Note: Oregon temporarily repealed its ban on selling tobacco to minors in 1955.) (1955–1988); 18 (Note: The smoking age in Oregon was 18 in 1988.) (1988–2018)				21 (2018–)		
Pennsylvania	? (–1988)		16 (Note: The smoking age in Pennsylvania was 16 in 1988.) (1988–?); 18 (Note: The smoking age in Pennsylvania was raised from 16 to 18 sometime between 1988–2020.) (?–2020)			21 (Note: Since 2019, the smoking age in Pennsylvania has been 21 under federal law. State law raised the smoking age to 21 in 2020 to align with federal law. State law included an exemption for military personnel 18–20.) (2020–)	
Puerto Rico	18 (Note: Since 2019, the smoking age in the Puerto Rico has been 21 under federal law. Under current territorial law, it is 18.) (?–)						
Rhode Island	None (–1939); 16 (Note: The smoking age in Rhode Island was 16 in 1939.) (1939–?)		18 (Note: The smoking age in Rhode Island was 18 in 1988.) (1988–2021)			21 (Note: Since 2019, the smoking age in Rhode Island has been 21 under federal law. State law raised the smoking age to 21 in 2021 to align with federal law.) (2021–)	
South Carolina	? (–1988)		18 (Note: The smoking age in South Carolina was 18 in 1988. Since 2019, the smoking age in South Carolina has been 21 under federal law. Under current state law, it is 18.) (1988–)				
South Dakota	? (–1988)		18 (Note: The smoking age in South Dakota was 18 in 1988.) (1988–2020)			21 (Note: Since 2019, the smoking age in South Dakota has been 21 under federal law. South Dakota raised the smoking age to 21 in 2021 to align with federal law.) (2020–)	
Tennessee	21 (Note: The smoking age in Tennessee was 21 before the 1970s. There were efforts to lower it to 18/19 in the 1960s.) (?–1970s)		18 (Note: The smoking age in Tennessee was 18 in 1988.) (1988–2021)			21 (Note: Since 2019, the smoking age in Tennessee has been 21 under federal law. State law raised the smoking age to 21 in 2021 to align with federal law.) (2021–)	
Texas	16 (Note: The smoking age in Texas was 16 in 1988.) (–1989)			18 (Note: The smoking age in Texas was raised from 16 to 18 in 1989.) (1989–2019)	21 (Note: The smoking age was raised to 21 by the Texas Legislature four months prior to the federal Tobacco 21 law. State law included a grandfather clause that exempted adults born before August 31, 2001, and an exemption for military personnel 18–20.) (2019–)		
United States Virgin Islands	18 (Note: Since 2019, the smoking age in the Puerto Rico has been 21 under federal law. Under current territorial law, it is 18.) (?–)						
Utah	21 (Note: The smoking age in Utah prior to 1953 was 21.) (?–1953)	19 (Note: The smoking age in Utah was lowered from 21 to 19 in 1953.) (1953–2019)			21 (Note: The smoking age was raised to 21 by the Utah State Legislature ten months prior to the federal Tobacco 21 law. State law included an exemption for military personnel and their spouses and dependents 19–20.) (2019–)		
Vermont	? (–1988); 17 (Note: The smoking age in Vermont was 17 in 1988.) (1988–?)			18 (Note: The smoking age in Vermont was raised from 17 to 18 sometime between 1988–2019.) (?–2019)	21 (Note: The smoking age was raised to 21 by the Vermont General Assembly three months prior to the federal Tobacco 21 law.) (2019–)		
Virginia	? (–1988)		16 (Note: The smoking age was 16 in 1988.) (1988–?); 18 (Note: The smoking age in Virginia was raised from 16 to 18 in 1990.) (?–2019)		21 (Note: The smoking age was raised to 21 by the Virginia General Assembly five months prior to the federal Tobacco 21 law.) (2019–)		
Washington	18 (Note: The first law prohibiting the sale of tobacco to minors was in 1901.) (1901–1909); 21 (Note: The smoking age in Washington was increased to 21 in 1909 and remained until 1971.) (1909–1971)		18 (Note: The smoking age in Washington was lowered to 18 in 1971.) (1971–2020)			21 (Note: Since 2019, the smoking age in Washington has been 21 under federal law. State law raised the smoking age to 21 in 2020 to align with federal law.) (2020–)	
West Virginia	? (–1988)		18 (Note: The smoking age in West Virginia was 18 in 1988.) (1988–2024)			21 (Note: Since 2019, the smoking age in West Virginia has been 21 under federal law. West Virginia raised the smoking age to 21 in 2024 to comply with federal law.) (2024–)	
Wisconsin	None (–1988)			18 (Note: The smoking age in Wisconsin was raised to 18 sometime between 1988–2022. Since 2019, the smoking age in Wisconsin has been 21 under federal law. Under current state law, it is 18. In 2022, a bill to amend state law to raise the smoking age to 21 passed in the Wisconsin State Assembly and is pending in the state senate.) (?–)			
Wyoming	None (–1988)			18 (Note: The smoking age in Wyoming was raised to 18 sometime between 1988–2020.) (?–2020)		21 (Note: Since 2019, the smoking age in Wyoming has been 21 under federal law. State law raised the smoking age to 21 in 2020 to align with federal law.) (2020–)	

== See also ==
- Age of candidacy
- Age of consent
  - Ages of consent in the United States
- Age of majority – when a minor becomes a legal adult
- Family Smoking Prevention and Tobacco Control Act
- Gambling age
- Legal drinking age – worldwide view of drinking ages
  - Legal drinking age controversy in the United States
- Mature minor doctrine
- Marriageable age
  - Marriage age in the United States
- Legal smoking age – worldwide view of smoking ages
- Shoulder tap (alcohol)
- List of smoking bans
- Tobacco 21
- Voting age
- Youth rights
- Youth suffrage
