= Generational smoking ban =

Laws prohibiting the sale of tobacco products to people born after a certain date

Tobacco-free generation policies or generational smoking bans are bans on selling combustible cigarettes to people born after a certain year. Part of tobacco control or tobacco endgame, apart from the Maldives they only ban sales of combustible tobacco products, such as cigarettes which burn, not ecigs.

The Maldives was the first country to do so, followed by the UK. And other places, such as Turkey, Canada and parts of the United States, are considering such a smoke-free generation policy. The EU cannot do so as a bloc because health policy is decided by individual countries, such as Ireland.

== Aim and impact ==
A typical aim is to reduce the proportion of adults and teenagers who smoke to under 5% of the population.

== History ==
In Australia a tobacco-free generation was proposed by Ivan Dean in 2014, without success. It would have prohibited the sale of tobacco products to anyone born after 2000. In New Zealand, a law was passed in 2022 and then repealed in 2024 (never enforced). The Smokefree Environments and Regulated Products (Smoked Tobacco) Amendment Act 2022 would have prohibited the sale of tobacco to anyone born after 2008.

== Countries ==
Country	Year law took effect	Affects people born after	Notes	Ref
Maldives	2025	2006	vaping also banned	
United Kingdom	2027	2008		
