= Legal smoking age =

Minimum age at which a person can legally purchase or consume tobacco products

Minimum legal age to purchase tobacco by country (2022): Illegal at any age Minimum age is 21 Minimum age is 20 Minimum age is 19 Minimum age is 18 Minimum age is 17 Minimum age is 16 No regulation/no age set

The smoking age is the minimum legal age required to purchase or use tobacco or cannabis products. Most countries have laws that forbid sale of tobacco products to persons younger than certain ages, usually the age of majority or the drinking age .

This article does not discuss laws that regulate electronic cigarettes.

== International law ==
According to the WHO Framework Convention on Tobacco Control (article 16):

Each Party shall adopt and implement effective legislative, executive, administrative or other measures at the appropriate government level to prohibit the sales of tobacco products to persons under the age set by domestic law, national law or eighteen. [...]

== Laws by region ==
=== Africa ===
Minimum age to purchase tobacco in Africa as of 2015: Minimum age is 21 Minimum age is 19 Minimum age is 18 Minimum age is 16 No minimum age

Country	De jure		Notes
Country	Legal age to smoke any tobacco products	Legal age to buy any tobacco products	Notes
Algeria	None	19	It is illegal to sell tobacco products to minors under the age of 19 years. (Chapitre IV sur les problèmes de santé l'article 93: "la vente de tabac ou produits du tabac aux mineurs est interdite".) The legal age to buy tobacco products has been 19 years since June 1984.
Angola	None	18	It is illegal to sell tobacco to minors under the age of 18.
Benin	None	18	
Botswana	None	18	It is illegal to sell tobacco to minors under the age of 18. Any person who sells, by retail, any tobacco product, shall display clearly, for the public, a notice to the effect that the sale of any tobacco product to a person under the age of 18 years is prohibited.
Burkina Faso	None	18	
Burundi	None	18	It is illegal to sell cigarettes to anyone under the age of 18. Other tobacco products are not regulated.
Cameroon	None		
Cape Verde	None		
Central African Republic	None		
Chad	18		It is illegal to sell tobacco to a minor. Minors and pregnant women may not smoke in public.
Comoros	None	18	The sale of tobacco products to minors is prohibited. Vendors of tobacco products must visibly and prominently display at their point of sale a notice of prohibition of the sale of tobacco to minors and by minors.
Republic of the Congo	18		
Democratic Republic of the Congo	18		It is illegal for minors to smoke in public, and for anyone to give or sell tobacco to a minor. (Arrete Ministeriel^{N°1250} Article 1: L'usage, la vente, l'achat et la consommation du tabac, de ses produits et de ses dérivés sont strictement interdits aux mineurs.)
Djibouti	None	16	It is illegal to sell tobacco products to a minor under the age of 16 years. A notice with the sale restrictions has to be placed at point of sale.
Egypt	18		The sale of tobacco products to persons under the age of 18 is prohibited.
Equatorial Guinea	18		
Eritrea	None	18	
Ethiopia	None	18	"No person may directly or indirectly give, provide or sell any tobacco product to a person under the age of 18."
Gabon	None	18	
Gambia	None		
Ghana	18		
Guinea-Bissau	None		
Kenya	None	18	It is illegal to sell tobacco products to anyone under the age of 18 years. There is no minimum age to possess tobacco or smoke in public.
Lesotho	None		
Liberia	18		It is illegal to sell or supply tobacco to a minor. Minors may not consume tobacco at any public place.
Libya	None	18	It is strictly prohibited to sell any tobacco product to a person under the age of 18 years.
Madagascar	None	18	
Malawi	None		
Mali	None	18	
Mauritius	18		A person must be 18 years old to purchase or to smoke cigarettes including any tobacco products as is indicated in Public Health (Restrictions on Tobacco Products) Regulations 1999, Sec. 2(e)(i)).
Morocco	None		
Mozambique	None	18	
Namibia	None	18	It is illegal to sell or supply tobacco to a minor. No minimum age prior to 14 April 2010.
Niger	None; 18 (to enter smoking room or facility)	18	It is illegal to sell tobacco products to a minor. Minors may not enter any smoking room or facility where smoking is permitted by law. No minimum age prior to 17 July 2008.
Nigeria	None	18	It is illegal to sell, give or otherwise supply tobacco products to a minor.
Republic of the Congo	None		
Rwanda	None	18	It is prohibited to involve a person under 18 in the buying, selling and exchanging of tobacco and tobacco products. It is also prohibited for the seller to sell tobacco and tobacco products to a person under 18.
São Tomé and Príncipe	None	16	
Senegal	None	18	It is illegal to sell or give tobacco to a person under the age of 18 years. (Chapitre III.- ^{Accès aux produits du tabac: Article 17} Il est interdit de vendre ou d'offrir aux mineurs ou de faire vendre ou de faire offrir par les mineurs du tabac ou tout produit du tabac.)
Seychelles	18		
Somalia	None		
South Africa	18		It is illegal to sell or supply any tobacco product to a person under the age of 18.
South Sudan	None		
Eswatini	None	18	It is illegal to sell and give tobacco to anyone under the age of 18 years.
Sudan	None; 18 (to enter smoking room or facility)	18	It is illegal to sell or give tobacco to a minor. Anyone under the age of 18 may also not handle, store, work or produce with tobacco or within such a facility.
Tanzania	18		It is unlawful to sell or give tobacco products to a minor, and to smoke such tobacco products if the individual is younger than 18 years.
Togo	None	18	It is illegal to sell or give any tobacco product to a minor.
Tunisia	None		
Uganda	None	21	It is illegal for a person below the age of 21 to access cigarettes.
Zambia	None	16	It is illegal to sell tobacco to anyone under age 16. No minimum age for consumption and possession in public. No minimum age prior to 1 January 1993.
Zimbabwe	None	18	It is illegal to sell or give tobacco products to anyone under the age of 18. Minors may not sell tobacco.

=== Americas ===
Minimum age to purchase tobacco in Canada, Greenland, Mexico, and the United States as of December 2019* Minimum age is 21 Minimum age is 19 Minimum age is 18 *May include laws that have not yet gone into effect.

Country	De jure		Notes
Country	Smoking age	Purchase age	Notes
Antigua and Barbuda	18		
Argentina	None	18	It is illegal to sell tobacco products to minors.
Bahamas	None	18	
Belize	None		
Bermuda	None	18	No person shall sell or supply any cigarettes, tobacco or tobacco products to a minor. A person selling or supplying any cigarettes, tobacco or tobacco products to a person who appears to be under 25 years of age shall, before selling or supplying them, ensure, by requiring photo identification, that the latter person is not a minor.
Bolivia	None	18	The sale of tobacco products to minors under the age of 18 years is prohibited.
Brazil	None	18	It is illegal to "sell Products whose ingredients can cause physical or psychic dependence, even if only through improper use" (...). This also includes tobacco products of any kind.
British Virgin Islands	None	18	It is illegal to sell or offer to sell tobacco to anyone under the age of 18 years. It is not illegal for minors to purchase, possess or consume tobacco.
Canada Regulations by province and territory: Province/territory / Smoking age / Purchase age / Notes; Federal Government / None / 18 / It is illegal to sell or supply tobacco products to a minor under the age of 18. The minimum age was 16 years of prior to 1994.; Alberta / 18 / / It is illegal to sell or supply tobacco products to a minor under the age of 18.; British Columbia / None / 19; Manitoba / None / 18 / It is illegal to sell, give, buy for, lend or otherwise provide tobacco products to anyone under the age of 18 years. Parents can provide tobacco products to their children on private property. Further it is legal to supply tobacco to a minor if it is solely for use in traditional Aboriginal spiritual or cultural practices or ceremonies.; New Brunswick / None / 19 / It is illegal to sell and supply tobacco products to anyone under the age of 19 years. It is also illegal to attempt to purchase tobacco on behalf of, or for the purpose of resale to, a person under the age of 19 years.; Newfoundland and Labrador / None / 19 / It is illegal to sell, give or furnish, directly or indirectly, tobacco to a person under the age of 19 years.; Northwest Territories / None / 19; Nova Scotia / 19 / / No vendor or employee of a vendor shall sell or give tobacco or a tobacco product to a person under the age of nineteen years. No person shall purchase tobacco or a tobacco product on behalf of, or for the purpose of resale or give tobacco or a tobacco product, to a person under the age of nineteen years. No person under the age of nineteen years may possess tobacco.; Nunavut / None / 19 / No person shall sell or supply, or offer to sell or supply, tobacco to a person who is less than 19 years old.; Ontario / None / 19 / No person shall sell or supply tobacco to a person who is less than 19 years old. No person shall sell or supply tobacco to a person who appears to be less than 25 years old unless he or she has required the person to provide identification and is satisfied that the person is at least 19 years old.; Prince Edward Island / None / 21 / No person shall sell or supply tobacco to a person under the age of 21 years. No person shall purchase or attempt to purchase tobacco on behalf of, or for the purpose of resale to, a person under the age of 21 years. It is legal to supply tobacco to a minor if it is solely for use in traditional Aboriginal spiritual or cultural practices or ceremonies. The minimum legal age for tobacco sales was raised from 19 to 21 on 1 March 2020, after a private members' bill passed third reading on 21 November 2019, and Royal Assent given on 28 November 2019. The bill exempted individuals born on or before 1 March 2001.; Quebec / None / 18 / It is illegal to sell tobacco to anyone under the age of 18 years. The operator of a tobacco retail outlet may not give tobacco to a minor. The operator of a tobacco retail outlet may not sell tobacco to an adult, if the operator knows the person is purchasing the tobacco for a minor.; Saskatchewan / None / 19 / It is illegal to sell, lend, assign, give or send tobacco to anyone under the age of 19 years. The minimum age was 18 prior to February 1, 2024.; Yukon / 19 / 19 / The Tobacco and Vaping Products Control and Regulation Act, effective 5 March 2020, replaced the 2008 Smoke-free Places Act. The new act includes the regulation of vaping and vapour products.
Chile	None	18	It is illegal to sell any form of tobacco to a person under the age of 18 years.
Colombia	None	18	It is forbidden for any individual or legal entity to directly or indirectly sell tobacco products and its derivatives in any of its presentations to minors under the age of 18 years. In case of question, one must ask each tobacco purchaser to show that he has reached majority age.
Costa Rica	None	18	Tobacco products may not be sold to minors. Wholesale or retail vendors of products shall have the obligation, at their own expense, to display posters that are visible, clear and prominently placed on the inside of places of sale, stating that the sale of tobacco products to minors is prohibited.
Cuba	None	18	Minors cannot legally buy tobacco, but stores may sell it to those who look 13 or older.
Cayman Islands	None	18	Tobacco Law, 2007 Part V – Section 10: No person shall sell tobacco to a minor.
Dominican Republic	None	18	It is illegal to sell tobacco to a person under the age of 18 years.
Ecuador	None	18	It is illegal to sell or let sell tobacco to or by a minor.
El Salvador	None	18	It is illegal to sell or give tobacco to a minor.
Falkland Islands	None		
Guatemala	18		It is illegal to sell tobacco products to anyone under the age of 18 years. Public consumption of tobacco by minors is prohibited. (El decreto 90–97, Código de Salud, indica en su artículo 50)
Guyana	None	18	No tobacco may be sold or furnished to a minor.
Haiti	None	18	
Honduras	None	21	The sale and gifting of tobacco-derived products to persons under 21 years of age is prohibited.
Jamaica	None	18	
Mexico	None	18	
Nicaragua	None	18	
Panama	None	18	The sale of tobacco products to minors is prohibited.
Paraguay	None	18	It is unlawful to sell tobacco products to anyone under the age of 18 years.
Peru	18		The sale of tobacco products to/by minors under the age of 18 is prohibited.
Trinidad and Tobago	None	18	Tobacco shall not be sold to or by a child under the age of 18 years.
United States	Varies by state	21	See also: U.S. history of tobacco minimum purchase age by state Since 20 December 2019, the smoking age in all U.S. states, territories and the District of Columbia has become 21.
Uruguay	None	18	It is illegal to sell tobacco to a minor. A clearly legible notice with the sale ban to under anyone under the age of 18 years has to be placed inside and outside the premises.
Venezuela	None	18	It is illegal to sell or supply tobacco products to a minor anyone under 18.

=== Asia ===
Minimum age to purchase tobacco in Asia as of 2022 Illegal at any age Minimum age is 21 Minimum age is 20 Minimum age is 19 Minimum age is 18 Minimum age is 17 Minimum age is 16 No minimum age or unknown

Country	De jure		Notes
Country	Smoking age	Purchase age	Notes
Afghanistan	None	18	The Tobacco Control Law 2015 explicitly bans the sale of tobacco products to anyone under the age of 18. The law applies to traditional cigarettes, water pipes, hookahs, and naswar (a widely consumed smokeless tobacco). Under Taliban rule, certain specific smoking restrictions have been added, such as a blanket ban on hookah/shisha consumption in public spaces, which is enforced by moral authorities.
Bahrain	None	18	It is illegal to sell cigarettes or any other tobacco to a person under the age of 18 years.
Bhutan	18		Further information: Tobacco Control Act of Bhutan 2010 The sale of tobacco was illegal in Bhutan from 2004 to 2021.
Brunei	18		It is illegal to sell, give or otherwise furnish tobacco products to anyone under the age of 18 years. It is illegal for minors to possess, buy or consume tobacco products.
Bangladesh	16		It is illegal to sell tobacco products to anyone under the age of 16 years. Any police-officer in uniform or any other person or class of persons duty authorized by the Government has the power to seize and destroy tobacco products of anyone under the age of 16 years whom they find smoking in public.
Cambodia	None	18	Any act of selling or distributing all types of tobacco products to persons aged under 18 years or to pregnant women whose pregnancy is obvious or is realized must be punished with six days to one month in prison and a fine of 100,000 riel to 1 million riel.
China	None	18	It is illegal to sell tobacco products to minors. No one shall smoke on school or education premises. Weakly enforced to not enforced. No age limit prior to 29 December 2006.
East Timor	None	17	It is illegal to sell and supply tobacco products to persons under the age of 17 years.
Hong Kong	None	18	It is illegal to sell, give or otherwise furnish tobacco products to anyone under the age of 18 years.
India	None	Varies by state	Current proposals are to raise the age to 21. Under the national Cigarettes and Other Tobacco Products Act (COTPA) 2003, the minimum legal age to purchase tobacco products across the rest of India is 18 years old. However, individual states have recently have passed state-level amendments to combat youth addiction. In Karnataka, the minimum legal age for purchasing tobacco products was officially raised from 18 to 21 years old. Similarly, the state of Jharkhand has also enacted legislation that successfully hiked its minimum tobacco consumption and purchase age to 21 years old.
Indonesia	None	21	It is illegal to sell and supply tobacco products to pregnant women or anyone under the age of 21 years.
Iran	None	18	It is illegal to sell and supply tobacco products to anyone under the age of 18 years. Violation will result in confiscation of tobacco from the minor and a fine for the salesperson.
Iraq	18		
Israel	None	18	It is illegal to sell tobacco products to a minor. No minimum age prior to 12 November 2004.
Jordan	18		It is illegal to sell tobacco to a minor. It is also illegal to provide water pipes in cafes, restaurants and similar places.
Japan	20		It is illegal to supply tobacco to persons under 20 years. It is punishable by a ¥10,000 fine.
Kazakhstan	None	21	
Kuwait	None	21	It is illegal to sell or give tobacco products to anyone under the age of 21 years.
Kyrgyzstan	None	18	No minor shall sell or be sold tobacco products.
Laos	None	18	It is illegal to sell and supply tobacco products to persons under the age of 18 years.
Lebanon	18		It is illegal to sell or distribute tobacco to a minor.
Macau	None	18	It is illegal to sell tobacco to a person under the age of 18 years. It is not illegal for a minor to smoke or to obtain tobacco from a person of the legal age.
Malaysia	None	18	It is illegal to sell tobacco products to a minor.
Maldives	None	Before 1 January 2007	The sale of tobacco to people born on or after 1 January 2007 is illegal.
Mongolia	21		
Nepal	None	18	It is illegal to sell or distribute tobacco products to minors and pregnant women.
North Korea	None	17	It is illegal to sell tobacco products to a minor. (The tobacco law does not define the word "minor", but age of majority is reached at the age of 17 years).
Oman	18		
Pakistan	None	18	It is illegal to sell tobacco to a person under the age of 18 years. A clearly legible notice with the sale restriction has to be placed at point of sale.
Palestine	18		
Philippines	18		Only people over 18 may buy cigarettes and tobacco due to the "STOP for Health Act". (Stop Tobacco and Other Products for Health)
Qatar	None	18	It is illegal to sell cigarettes or any other tobacco to a person under the age of 18 years.
Saudi Arabia	18		
Singapore	21		Singapore takes a very stern view on underage smoking. The current smoking age in Singapore is 21 years old, after being raised from the previous 18 years old to 19 years old on 1 January 2019 then to 20 on 1 January 2020. It was raised again to 21 on 1 January 2021. It is illegal to sell or give, directly or indirectly any tobacco product to any under-aged person, and anyone caught doing so will be subjected to harsh penalties. Anyone caught selling tobacco products to an under-aged person will be charged in court and can be fined up to 5,000 Singapore dollars for the first offence, and up to $10,000 for the second and subsequent offences. In addition, the store involved will have the tobacco licence suspended for 6 months at the first offence, and permanently revoked for the second offence. However, if the store involved is caught selling to minors in school uniform, or to minors below the age of 12, the tobacco licence will be permanently revoked even at its first offence. Anyone caught buying tobacco products for an under-aged person will be charged in court and can be fined up to 2,500 Singapore dollars for the first offence, and up to 5,000 for the second and subsequent offences. Anyone caught giving tobacco products to an under-aged person will be charged in court and can be fined up to 500 Singapore dollars for the first offence, and up to 1,000 Singapore dollars for the second and subsequent offences. It is illegal for minors to purchase, use or possess any tobacco product in public. Minors caught doing so are usually given a warning or a 30-dollar composition fine, with their school and parents informed and follow-up actions taken by the school. Minors caught more than once will have to attend not less than two smoking cessation counselling session to have their offences compounded. Minors who fail to comply with the above requirements or if they are caught four or more times, they can be charged in court and be liable to a fine not exceeding 300 Singapore dollars upon conviction.
South Korea	None	19	The age limit for purchasing tobacco is after 1 January of the year one's age turns 19.
Sri Lanka	None	21	It is against the law to sell any tobacco product to a person under the age of 21 years.
Syria	None	18	It is unlawful to sell or give tobacco to a person under the age of 18 years.
Taiwan	20		It is illegal to sell or provide tobacco to persons under the age of 20 years. It is illegal to force, induce or use other means to cause a pregnant woman to smoke. It is illegal for a pregnant women or a person under the age of 20 to smoke. No penalty is provided for pregnant women who smoke.
Tajikistan	None		
Thailand	20		
Turkmenistan	None	21	Tobacco products can be legally only be bought in specific state-owned stores, where buyers are routinely required to show identification to confirm they are at least 21. Smoking is banned in virtually all indoor and outdoor public areas, workplaces, public transport, and even inside private vehicles parked in public areas.
United Arab Emirates	18		
Uzbekistan	None	21	In 2023, President Shavkat Mirziyoyev signed a law prohibiting the sale of alcohol and nicotine products to those under 21 years of age, increasing it from 20 years.
Vietnam	18		It is illegal for people less than 18 years of age use, buy, and sell tobacco products. It is illegal to sell and supply tobacco product to people less than 18 years of age.
Yemen	None		

=== Europe ===
Legend
Minimum age to purchase and consume tobacco products
Minimum age to purchase tobacco product, but no minimum age to consume tobacco products
No minimum age to purchase and consume tobacco products

Minimum age to purchase tobacco in Europe as of 2015: Minimum age is 18 Minimum age is 16 Depending on jurisdiction Note: Regulation by canton in Switzerland is below.

Minimum age to purchase tobacco in Switzerland by canton as of 2015: Minimum age is 18 Minimum age is 16 No minimum age

Country	De jure		Notes
Country	Smoking age	Purchase age	Notes
Albania	None	18	It is illegal to sell or supply tobacco products to minors under the age of 18 years. Contrary to that, a lot of salesmen sell cigarettes to minors in Albania. Acquiring tobacco products is very easy for minors despite the law.
Armenia	None	18	It is illegal to sell tobacco products anyone under the age of 18 years. Minors may not sell tobacco products. No minimum age prior to 24 December 2004.
Austria	18		The minimum age is regulated by each federal state, but is nationwide 18 years. It is illegal in every state to sell or give tobacco products to a person under the age of 18 years as well as the consumption by a person under the age of 18 years in any public place.
Azerbaijan	None	18	It is illegal to sell tobacco products to anyone under the age of 18 years. The packaging of tobacco products must contain a warning that sale to minors is prohibited. No minimum age prior to 1 January 2002.
Belarus	None	18	(Decree No. 28 of 2002 ^{Section 32.} "It is banned to sell tobacco products to citizens (by citizens) of the Republic of Belarus, foreign citizens and individuals with no citizenship under 18 years old.")
Belgium	None	18	("It is forbidden to sell tobacco products to young people under the age of 18 and advertising for tobacco products is forbidden.")
Bosnia and Herzegovina	18		It is illegal to sell and gift tobacco products to anyone under the age of 18 years. It is illegal for minors under the age of 18 years to gift, sell and consume tobacco products. The minimum age was 15 years prior to 28 September 2004. No minimum age prior to 9 March 1998.
Bulgaria	None	18	It is illegal to sell tobacco products to anyone under the age of 18 years.
Croatia	None	18	It is illegal to sell tobacco products to minors. It is the responsibility of any salesperson to ensure that no tobacco is sold to minors and therefore to request an ID to make sure that the purchaser is at least 18 years of age. Minors may not sell tobacco products.
Cyprus	None	18	It is illegal to sell or otherwise provide tobacco products to a minor. "(...)any person who provides a tobacco product to a minor is guilty of offense and in any case of his/her conviction, he/she shall be subject to a penalty not exceeding one thousand pounds or to incarceration not exceeding six months and/or to both penalties."
Czech Republic	None	18	Selling tobacco products to anyone under 18 is prohibited. Sale of tobacco products and tobacco through vending machines is permitted if the tobacco purchase age is not violated. The seller shall place a clearly visible notice displaying the sale restrictions of tobacco to person under the age of 18. A person selling tobacco must be 18 years or older, unless the minor is preparing for a future career in the hotel or tourism industry, as a cook-waiter or salesman. However, it is very easy to get tobacco products for minors as many sellers do not check the age. The minimum age was 16 years prior to 2 September 1999.
Denmark	None	18	The minimum age was 16 years prior to 1 September 2008.
Estonia	18		The minimum age to purchase tobacco products or to smoke in public is set at 18. Minors may not be in possession of, or handle tobacco products.
Finland	18		Prior to October 2010 it was not illegal for minors to smoke in public. The minimum age was 16 years prior to 1 March 1995. Yet smoking as a minor despite being prohibited has no legal sanctions.
France	None	18	It is illegal to sell tobacco products to anyone under the age of 18 years. Minors under the age of 18 years may not smoke in any school or on school property. Vending machines outside a tobacco shop is prohibited. Prior to 21 July 2009 the minimum age to purchase tobacco products was 16 years of age.
Georgia	None	18	It is illegal to sell tobacco products to minors under the age of 18.
Germany	18		The Protection of Young Persons Act states that children and young people under 18 years of age shall not be sold tobacco products nor should they be permitted to smoke in public. This does not apply to married adolescents. Minimum age was 18 from 10 June 1943 until 1 January 1952. Minimum age was 16 from 1 January 1952 to 1 September 2007.
Gibraltar	18		It is illegal to sell and furnish tobacco products to anyone under the age of 18 years. Any police officer may confiscate tobacco from a minor in public. The minimum age was 16 years prior to 7 July 2006.
Greece	None	18	It is illegal to sell tobacco to minors.
Hungary	18		It is illegal to sell or supply tobacco products to anyone under the age of 18. It is illegal to smoke under the age of 18. The sale of tobacco is prohibited within 200 m of schools and health care units.
Iceland	None	18	It is illegal to sell or deliver tobacco products to anyone under the age of 18 years. Minors may not handle or sell tobacco products. No minimum age prior to 1 January 1985. The minimum age was 16 years from 1 January 1985 to 1 October 1996.
Ireland	18		The sale of tobacco to persons under 18 is illegal. It is illegal to buy or smoke cigarettes if under the age of 18. There is a proposal to increase this to 21. The minimum age was 16 years prior to 27 March 2002.
Italy	None	18	It is illegal to sell tobacco products to anyone under the age of 18 years. Violation is punished with a fine between €250.00 and €1000.00. If the law is violated more than once the fine is increased to €500.00 and €2,000.00 and a revocation of the tobacco license for at least 3 months. Minimum age for electronic cigarettes was 16 prior to 1 May 2013.
Kosovo (Note: Disputed.)	None		
Latvia	20		The sale of tobacco products to persons under the age of 20 is prohibited. Any person aged 20 to 25 must show a valid ID when purchasing tobacco products.
Liechtenstein	18		It is illegal for anyone under the age of 18 to possess or consume tobacco products.
Lithuania	18		No minimum age to smoke prior to 1 May 2015.
Luxembourg	None	18	It is illegal to sell tobacco products to anyone under the age of 18 years. No minimum age prior to 1 January 2006. Minimum purchase age increased from 16 to 18 on 1 August 2017.
Malta	None	18	"No person shall sell, supply or distribute by way of compensation or otherwise, any cigarettes, cigars, tobacco, tobacco products or smoking requisites to any person who is under the age of 18 years, or in any manner induce such person to smoke."
Moldova	None	18	It is illegal to sell tobacco to anyone under the age of 18 years.
Montenegro	None	18	It is illegal to sell tobacco to anyone under the age of 18. A poster with the sale restrictions must be placed at point of sale.
Netherlands	None	18	The sale of tobacco to persons under 18 is illegal. Smoking of tobacco is prohibited by law in all public buildings and in public transport. As of 1 January 2004 every employee has the right to work in a smoke-free environment. All forms of tobacco advertising, promotion or sponsorship are prohibited. Smoking remains prevalent in the Netherlands despite these efforts. Until 2024, tobacco was easily available in supermarkets. Since 1 July, supermarkets and other food/beverage-centered shops have been prohibited from selling tobacco.
North Macedonia	None	18	It is illegal to sell tobacco to anyone under the age of 18 years.
Norway	None	18	No age limit for use of tobacco but no sales of cigarettes or Swedish snus to people under 18 by law. Vending machines are only allowed when they are cited inside an approved store, with a demand of buying a receipt from the cashier first.
Poland	None	18	Minors are not allowed to buy tobacco products.
Portugal	18		It is illegal to sell or give any tobacco product to a minor as well as the consumption of a tobacco product in any public place by a minor. There is a proposition to ban vending machines in places accessible to people younger than 18. Minimum age was 16 prior to 1 January 2008.
Romania	18		There is a ban on sale of tobacco to those younger than 18. Vending machines selling tobacco are banned. There is a ban for minors to smoke in public places such as parks or streets, and the penalty can be a fine of 100-500 lei if minors get caught.
Russia	18		Retail sales of tobacco products to any person under the age of 18 years are an offence. There is a ban for minors to smoke.
Serbia	None	18	The sale to persons under 18 is prohibited. Contrary to that, a lot of salesmen sell cigarettes to minors in Serbia. Acquiring tobacco products is very easy for minors despite the law.
Slovakia	None	18	Tobacco sales to under 18 year olds are prohibited.
Slovenia	None	18	It is illegal to sell tobacco to anyone under the age of 18. ID-Card or passport has to be shown if requested.
Spain	None	18	It is illegal to sell any tobacco product or other smoking substances (e.g. electronic cigarettes) to a person under the age of 18 years. Minimum age was 16 in most regions prior to 1 January 2006.
Sweden	None	18	It is illegal to sell or commercially distribute tobacco to a person under the age of 18 years. No minimum age prior to 1 January 1997.
Switzerland	None	18	Since October 2024, the Tobacco Products Act bans selling or giving tobacco products to a person under the age of 18 years. (Until 2024, regulations were regional, with 16 cantons at 18 years, 8 cantons at 16 years and 2 cantons without any limit.)
Turkey	None	18	
Ukraine	None	18	
United Kingdom	16 (public possession de facto)	18 (purchase de jure)	England and Wales: It is illegal to sell tobacco to anyone under the age of 18. The minimum age to smoke in public is 16 and authorities have the duty to seize any tobacco or cigarette papers in the possession of any person apparently under the age of 16. Import: People 17 and older are entitled to a duty-free allowance for tobacco products. Minimum age to purchase was 16 from 1908 to 1 October 2007. No minimum age prior to 1908. The incoming Tobacco and Vapes Bill which is set to take effect in 2027 will ban persons born on or after 1 January 2009 from ever purchasing tobacco or vapes. This, if put in place, will effectively raise the legal smoking age year over year until it is fully illegal. A similar bill was passed in New Zealand but was dismissed before it came into effect.
United Kingdom	18		Scotland: A person who sells a tobacco product or cigarette papers to a person under the age of 18 commits an offence. Any person under the age of 18 who buys or attempts to buy a tobacco product or cigarette papers commits an offence as well as an adult who knowlingly buys a tobacco product or cigarette papers on behalf of a person under the age of 18. Any constable who has reasonable grounds for suspecting that a person in a public place is under the age of 18, and in possession of a tobacco product or cigarette papers may require the person to surrender the tobacco product. Import: People over the age of 17 are entitled to a duty-free allowance for tobacco products. Minimum age was 16 prior to 30 September 2007.
United Kingdom	18		Northern Ireland: A person who sells to a person under the age of 18 any tobacco or cigarette papers, whether for his or her own use or not, shall be guilty of an offence. A member of the Police Service of Northern Ireland may seize any tobacco or cigarette papers in the possession of any person apparently under the age of 18 whom he or she finds smoking in any street or public place. Minimum age was 16 prior to 1 September 2008.

=== Oceania ===
Country	De jure		Notes
Country	Smoking age	Purchase age	Notes
Australia Regulations by state/territory: Province/territory / Smoking age / Purchase age / Notes; Australian Capital Territory / None / 18 / It is illegal to sell tobacco products to a person under the age of 18 years. Further it is illegal to buy a tobacco product for a minor.; New South Wales / None / 18 / It is illegal to sell any tobacco or non-tobacco smoking product to a person who is under the age of 18 years.; Northern Territory / None / 18 / It is illegal to sell any tobacco product to a minor or on behalf of a minors. It is illegal to smoke in a vehicle with a person under the age of 18 years present.; Queensland / None / 18 / It is illegal for an adult to supply a tobacco product to a person under the age of 18 years; however, a responsible adult for a child does not commit an offence by supplying a smoking product to the child.; South Australia / None / 18 / It is an offence to supply any tobacco product to a person under the age of 18 years.; Tasmania / None / 18 / It is illegal to sell or supply tobacco to a person under the age of 18 years. Minimum age was 16 prior to 1 January 1997.; Victoria / None / 18 / It is illegal to supply tobacco to a minor. Smoking in a vehicle with a person under 18 present is an offence.; Western Australia / None / 18 / It is illegal to sell, deliver or supply tobacco or smoking implement to a minor. Purchase on behalf of people under 18 prohibited.	None	18	It is illegal to sell and supply tobacco to a minor.
Fiji	None	18	It is illegal to sell and supply tobacco to a minor.
Micronesia, Federated States of	18		It is illegal to sell and supply tobacco to a minor.
New Zealand	None	18	It is illegal to sell and supply tobacco products to a minor under 18 years. No minimum age prior to 1903. Minimum age of 15 years from 1903 to 1988. Minimum age of 16 years from 1988 to 1998. New Zealand had adopted legislation providing for a ‘smoke-free generation’ by prohibiting the sale of smoking tobacco to people born on or after 1 January 2009, but in February 2024 the incoming coalition government repealed this law before it took effect. The United Kingdom currently has similar legislation which is set to take effect in 2027.
Palau	None	18; 21 (Only rolling papers and elaus)	It is illegal to sell or give tobacco products to anyone under the age of 18 years. If the purchaser appears to be under the age of 30 years, ID must be checked before sale. It is illegal to employ anyone under the age of 21 handling tobacco products. It is illegal to sell rolling papers and elaus to anyone under the age of 21 years.
Papua New Guinea	None	18	It is illegal to sell or give tobacco to a person under the age of 18 years.
Samoa	21		It is illegal to sell tobacco to anyone under the age of 21 years. It is not illegal for a person under the age of 21 years to possess or smoke tobacco in public.
Solomon Islands	None	18	It is illegal to sell, give or otherwise supply tobacco to a minor.
Tonga	None	18	It is illegal to sell, give or otherwise supply tobacco to a minor.
Tokelau	16		It is illegal for a person under 16 to smoke tobacco.
Vanuatu	18		It is illegal to sell tobacco to persons under 18. It is illegal for persons under 18 to smoke tobacco.

== Historical regulations ==
Minimum age to purchase tobacco in the European Union as of 1995:
Minimum age was 18
Minimum age was 16
No set minimum age

Minimum age to purchase tobacco in the USA as of 1989:
Minimum age was 19
Minimum age was 18
Minimum age was 17
Minimum age was 16
No set minimum age

Minimum age to purchase tobacco in the US prior to December 20, 2019:
Minimum age was 21
Minimum age was 19
Minimum age was 18

== Tobacco-free generation policies ==
Tobacco-free generation policies or generational smoking bans are regulations prohibiting the sale of tobacco products to individuals born on or after a particular date.

The following countries have adopted or considered tobacco-free generation policies:

- In Australia a tobacco-free generation was proposed by Ivan Dean in 2014, without success. It would have prohibited the sale of tobacco products to anyone born after 2000.
- In New Zealand, a law was passed in 2022 and then repealed in 2024 (never enforced). The Smokefree Environments and Regulated Products (Smoked Tobacco) Amendment Act 2022 would have prohibited the sale of tobacco to anyone born after 2008.
- A law was proposed in the United Kingdom in 2023. In 2024, the government changed and re-introduced the Tobacco and Vapes Bill. The bill was approved by Parliament on 22 April 2026 and received royal assent on 29 April 2026 as the Tobacco and Vapes Act 2026. The law prohibits the sale of tobacco products to people born after 2008.
- A law passed in the Maldives in 2025, as a second amendment to the 2010 Tobacco Control Act. It prohibits the sale, purchase and use of tobacco products by people born after 2006. Enforced since 2025, it is the world’s first generational tobacco ban.

== Cannabis age ==
Minimum age to possess and purchase cannabis as of October 2026* Minimum age is 21 Minimum age is 20 Minimum age is 19 Minimum age is 18 *May include laws that have not yet gone into effect. Washington, D.C. allows recreational cannabis use, including sales.

Since 2012, various jurisdictions throughout the world have legalized cannabis for recreational use. In Mexico, Uruguay and cannabis-legal jurisdictions in the United States, the legal age to possess or purchase cannabis is identical to the tobacco purchase age (18 in Mexico and Uruguay and 21 in the United States). In Canada, the legal age to possess or purchase cannabis is 19 in all provinces and territories except Alberta (18) and Quebec (21). There are therefore two Canadian provinces (Manitoba and Quebec) where the age to purchase tobacco is lower than the age to possess and purchase cannabis, and one province (Prince Edward Island) where the tobacco purchase age is higher. Prior to December 2019, when the United States raised its tobacco purchase age to 21 in all states and territories, several U.S. states had tobacco purchase ages lower than their cannabis possession and purchase ages. In Germany, the legal age to possess and purchase cannabis is 18.

== Enforcement ==
To reduce illegal sales, active enforcement is more effective than giving retailers information. The retailer compliance with legislation can be assessed by test purchasing (mystery shopping).

Under Article 16 of the WHO Framework Convention on Tobacco Control (FCTC), most reporting Parties indicate that they ban sales of tobacco products to minors, and many have raised the minimum legal age of purchase. In the 2024 reporting cycle, several Parties reported increasing the minimum age, including the Cook Islands, Ethiopia, Ireland and the Maldives, which raised it to 21 years, and others reported expanding bans on sales to minors to cover additional tobacco and nicotine products and strengthening enforcement mechanisms and penalties.

A 2024 systematic review in Nicotine & Tobacco Research examining jurisdictions that raised the minimum legal sales age for tobacco to 20 or 21 found that higher ages of sale were generally associated with lower prevalence of cigarette smoking among people aged 11–20 years, particularly where age-of-sale laws formed part of broader tobacco-control measures.

== See also ==
- Age of candidacy
- Age verification
- Legal drinking age
- Legality of cannabis
- List of smoking bans
- Mature minor doctrine
- National Youth Rights Association
- Tobacco 21
- Tobacco control
- U.S. history of tobacco minimum purchase age by state
- Youth rights
- Youth suffrage
