= Tukuitonga =

Tukuitonga is a surname. Notable people with the surname include:

- Collin Tukuitonga (born 1957 or 1958), Niuean-born New Zealand doctor,
- Va'aiga Tukuitonga, Niuean politician
