= Smoking laws =

Smoking laws may refer to:

- Smoking ban, bans on smoking in public places
- Smoking age, legal age to purchase and/or consume tobacco products
