= Shoulder tap =

A Shoulder tap is a bid for attention, but by extension it may refer to

- Shoulder tap (alcohol), an act in which a minor asks an adult to purchase alcohol for him or her
- Shoulder tap, another term for an inter-processor interrupt on a multiprocessor system

It can also refer to:

- Shoulder tap (Yonkyō), an aikido move
