= Age of majority =

Age of adulthood defined in law

Age of majority varies by country or territory.

The age of majority is the age defining legal adulthood. At majority, a minor becomes an adult, assuming legal control over their person, actions, and decisions, gaining new rights, and ending parental rights.

Most countries set the age of majority at 18, but some jurisdictions have a higher age and others lower. The word majority here refers to having greater years and being of full age as opposed to minority, the state of being a minor. The law in a given jurisdiction may not actually use the term "age of majority". The term refers to a collection of laws bestowing the status of adulthood.

== Explanation ==
The term age of majority can be confused with the similar concept of the age of license. As a legal term, license means permission, referring to a legally enforceable right or privilege. Thus, the age of license for a specific activity, e.g. the age of licence to drive a motorcar or a motorcycle of a given mechanical power, is the minimum age at which a person may be authorised for that activity. The age of majority, on the other hand, recognises that the person has become a legal adult in that jurisdiction.

Many ages of license coincide with the age of majority to recognize the transition to legal adulthood, but they are nonetheless legally distinct concepts. One need not have attained the age of majority to have permission to exercise certain rights and responsibilities. Some ages of license may be higher, lower, or match the age of majority.

For example, to purchase alcoholic beverages, the age of license is 21 in all U.S. states. Another example is the voting age, which prior to 1971 was 21 in the US, as was the age of majority in all or most states. After the voting age was lowered from 21 to 18, the age of majority was lowered to 18 in most states. In most US states, one may obtain a driver's license, consent to sexual activity, and gain full-time employment at age 16 even though the age of majority is 18 in most states. In the Republic of Ireland the age of majority is 18, but one must be 21 or over to stand for election to the Houses of the Oireachtas. Also, in Portugal the age of majority is 18, and citizens who have reached that age are also eligible to run for Parliament, but they need to be 35 or over in order to run for president.

A child who is legally emancipated by a court of competent jurisdiction automatically attains to their maturity upon the signing of the court order. Only emancipation confers the status of maturity before a person has actually reached the age of majority. In almost all places, minors who marry are automatically emancipated. Some places also do the same for minors who are in the armed forces or who have a certain degree or diploma.

Minors who are emancipated may be able to choose where they live, sign contracts, and have control over their financial and medical decisions and generally make decisions free from parental control but are not exempt from age requirements set forth in law for other rights. For example, a minor can emancipate at 16 in the US (or younger depending on the state) but must still wait until 18 to vote or buy a firearm, and 21 to buy alcohol or tobacco.

The Jewish Talmud says that every judgment Josiah, the sixteenth king of Judah (c. 640–609 BC), issued from his coronation until the age of eighteen was reversed and he returned the money to the parties whom he judged liable, due to concern that in his youth he may not have judged the cases correctly. Other Jewish commentators have discussed whether age 13 or 18 is the age to make decisions in a Jewish Court.

Roman law did not have an age of majority in the modern sense, as individuals remained under the authority of the Pater familias until his death. The age of adulthood was set at 12 for girls and 14 for boys, with boys gaining rights such as marriage, military service, and any legal capacity that depended on age only, including, until the introduction of the Lex Villia, the ability to be eligible for public office.

The Lex Plaetoria allowed those under 25 to contest disadvantageous agreements in case of fraud, later extending to other circumstances, and the other party might escape repercussions only if a curator was involved. To enter a contract, individuals in this age group could request the praetor for such a curator, thus ensuring protection for both sides: this shielded the other contracting party from legal risk and allowed transactions to proceed, as no prudent person would engage without this safeguard. Unlike with a tutor, the requester retained full legal capacity to act, and the role of the curator was merely to prevent fraud. Later, under Marcus Aurelius, their appointment became mandatory. Someone under 25 who wanted to enter a contract had to request a curator, and could propose a candidate, which the praetor could reject. The curator's control over property became closer to that of a tutor, but it was only applied to the properties that the praetor assigned to him, not those acquired by the requester after his appointment.

Over time, there was a gradual evolution, initially focusing on property laws, eventually arriving at the modern concept of age of majority, commonly set at 18.

Since 2015, some countries have lowered the voting age to 16. Some countries, like England and Wales, are even considering lowering the age of majority to 16, similar to how it already is in Cuba and Scotland. The main argument for lowering is that, on average, young people are much more educated (both because of better individual educational outcomes and being raised by more educated parents) than in the past (the same argument was made in the 1970s when most countries lowered the age of majority from 21 to 18, which remains the age used for most countries, including the United States). Related to newer generations being more educated and being ready for life earlier: compared to the past, information is much more easily accessible as a result of the spread of the Internet, which can be accessed through both the personal computer and the smartphone.

A person reaches the age of majority at midnight at the beginning of the day of that person's relevant birthday; under English common law this was not always the case.

== Civil law ==
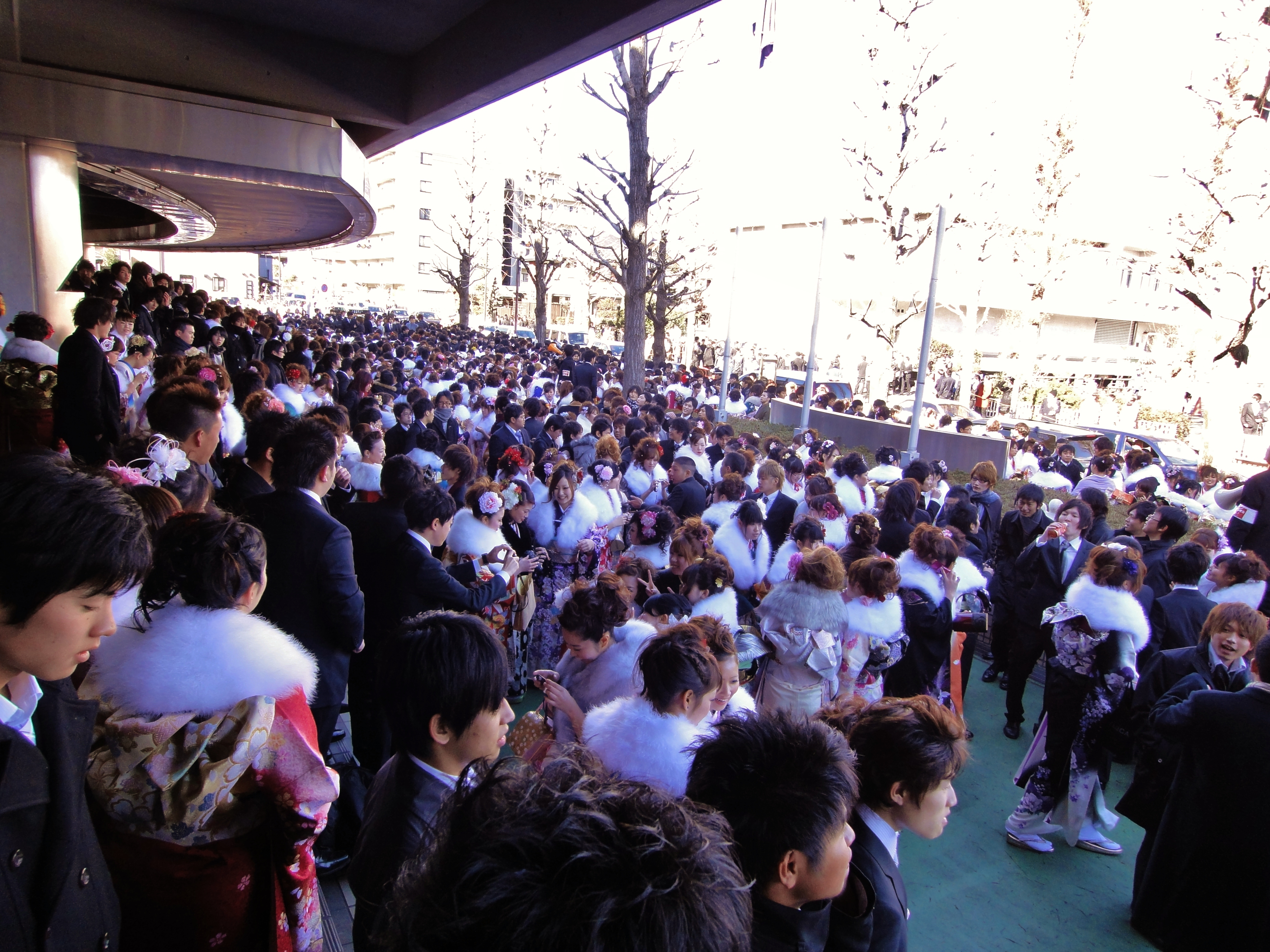
Coming of Age Day in Japan. The ceremony still targets age 20, even though age of majority was decreased from 20 to 18.

In many countries minors can be emancipated: depending on jurisdiction, this may happen through acts such as marriage, attaining economic self-sufficiency, obtaining an educational degree or diploma, or participating in a form of military service. In the United States, all states have some form of emancipation of minors.

The age of majority in countries (or administrative divisions) in the order of lowest to highest:

=== Age 16 ===
- Cambodia
- Cuba
- Myanmar
- United Kingdom
  - Scotland (Note: Age of Legal Capacity (Scotland) Act 1991)
- Vietnam

=== Age 17 ===
- North Korea
- Timor-Leste

=== Age 18 ===
- Afghanistan
- Albania
- Andorra
- Angola (Note: Article 24. The age of majority shall be 18.)
- Antigua and Barbuda
- Argentina (Note: Article 25. Minor and adolescent: minor is the person who has not turned eighteen. This Code refers to the adolescent as the minor who turned thirteen years of age.)
- Armenia
- Australia
- Austria
- Azerbaijan
- Bahamas
- Bahrain
- Bangladesh
- Barbados
- Belarus
- Belize
- Belgium
- Benin
- Bhutan
- Bolivia
- Bosnia and Herzegovina
- Botswana
- Brazil (Note: Those aged 16 or older can be emancipated upon marriage, by being approved for civil service, by graduating college or for being economically independent.)
- Brunei
- Bulgaria
- Burkina Faso
- Burundi
- Canada
  - Alberta
  - Manitoba
  - Ontario
  - Prince Edward Island
  - Quebec
  - Saskatchewan
- Cape Verde
- Central African Republic
- Chile
- China
  - Mainland China
  - Hong Kong
  - Macau
- Colombia
- Comoros
- Costa Rica
- Croatia
- Cyprus
- Czech Republic (Note: §30 Majority. An individual acquires full legal capacity upon reaching the age of majority. The age of majority is reached upon reaching eighteen years of age. Before reaching the age of majority, full legal capacity is acquired by being granted legal capacity or by entering into marriage. Legal capacity acquired by entering into marriage is not terminated upon termination or invalidation of marriage.)
- Democratic Republic of the Congo
- Denmark (incl. Faroe Islands and Greenland)
- Djibouti
- Dominica
- Dominican Republic
- Ecuador
- El Salvador
- Equatorial Guinea
- Eritrea
- Estonia
- Ethiopia
- Federated States of Micronesia
- Fiji
- Finland
- France (Note: A minor is an individual of either sex who is not yet eighteen years old.)
- Gambia
- Germany
- Georgia
- Ghana
- Greece
- Guatemala
- Guinea
- Guinea-Bissau
- Guyana
- Haiti
- Hungary
- Iceland
- India
- Indonesia
- Iran (Note: The age of majority is 15 Islamic lunar years for boys, and nine lunar years for girls.)
- Iraq (Note: Iraq's Civil Code defines the age of majority as 18. However, due to the Iraqi constitution and existing national instability, Note 1 (above) may apply as courts may choose between Shari'ah law and the Civil Code.)
- Ireland
- Israel
- Italy
- Jamaica
- Japan
- Jordan
- Kazakhstan
- Kenya (Note: Constitution of Kenya. Article 260. "Adult" means an individual who has attained the age of eighteen years, "child" means an individual who has not attained the age of eighteen years. Age of Majority Act, 1977. Section 2 Age of majority. A person shall be of full age and cease to be under any disability by reason of age on attaining the age of eighteen years.)
- Kosovo (Note: Constitution of Kosovo. Articles 45 and 71. Every citizen who is 18 years old or older can vote (article 45) and is eligible to become a candidate (article 71) for the Assembly of Kosovo)
- Kyrgyzstan
- Laos
- Latvia
- Lebanon
- Libya
- Liechtenstein
- Lithuania
- Luxembourg
- Malawi
- Malaysia
- Maldives
- Mali
- Malta
- Marshall Islands
- Mauritania
- Mauritius
- Mexico
- Moldova
- Monaco
- Mongolia
- Montenegro
- Morocco
- Namibia
- Nauru
- Nepal
- Netherlands (Note: Or at 16 or 17, upon marriage.)
- Nicaragua (female only)
- Nigeria
- North Macedonia
- Norway
- Oman
- Pakistan
- Palau
- Palestine
- Panama
- Papua New Guinea
- Paraguay
- Peru
- Philippines
- Poland (Note: Or upon marriage, which, for women, can happen as early as 16. The legal voting age is invariably 18.)
- Portugal
- Qatar
- Republic of the Congo
- Romania
- Russia (Note: Minors are emancipated upon marriage or in case of working on a labour agreement or being engaged in business activities.)
- Rwanda
- Saint Kitts and Nevis
- Saint Lucia
- Saint Vincent and the Grenadines
- San Marino
- Sao Tome and Principe
- Saudi Arabia
- Senegal
- Serbia
- Seychelles
- Sierra Leone
- Slovakia
- Slovenia
- Solomon Islands
- Somalia
- South Africa (Note: Children's Act, 2005 Article 1. "child" means a person under the age of 18 years, article 17. Age of majority – A child, whether male or female, becomes a major upon reaching the age of 18 years.)
- South Sudan
- Spain (Note: Constitution article 12. Spaniards come legally of age at eighteen years. Civil Code article 315. Legal age begins upon turning eighteen. The date of birth shall be included in full for the calculation of legal age.)
- Sri Lanka
- Sudan
- Suriname
- Sweden
- Switzerland
- Syria
- Taiwan
- Tajikistan
- Tanzania
- Togo
- Tonga
- Trinidad and Tobago
- Tunisia
- Turkey
- Turkmenistan
- Uganda
- Ukraine
- United Arab Emirates
- United Kingdom (excluding Scotland)
  - England
  - Northern Ireland
  - Wales
  - Crown Dependencies
    - Guernsey
    - Isle of Man
    - Jersey
  - British Overseas Territories
    - Gibraltar
- United States: all states, territories, and Washington, D.C. except: Alabama, Mississippi, Nebraska, and Puerto Rico. (Note: In all states and Washington, D.C., the legal alcohol purchase and smoking age is 21.)
- Uruguay
- Uzbekistan
- Vanuatu
- Vatican City
- Venezuela
- Yemen
- Zimbabwe

=== Age 19 ===
- Algeria
- Canada
  - British Columbia
  - New Brunswick
  - Newfoundland and Labrador
  - Northwest Territories
  - Nova Scotia
  - Nunavut
  - Yukon
- South Korea
- United States
  - Alabama
  - Nebraska

=== Age 20 ===
- New Zealand
- Thailand

=== Age 21 ===
- Cameroon
- Chad
- Côte d'Ivoire
- Egypt (Note: A 2015 cabinet draft proposal to lower the civil majority age to 18 was never ratified into law by presidential decree, leaving Article 44 active.)
- Eswatini
- Gabon
- Grenada
- Honduras (Note: In the light of article 16 of the Family Code, which provides that majority is attained at the age of 12 years, it may be inferred that the status of minor is retained in Honduras until the age of 18. However, according to article 36 of the Constitution of Honduras, all Hondurans over 18 years of age are citizens. This means that the quality of citizen is attained while a person is still a minor, thus involving the assumption of the status of minor adult. The latter contracts all the obligations of persons of full age and acquires the specific rights that are reserved for such persons, with a few exceptions.)
- Kuwait
- Lesotho
- Madagascar
- Mozambique
- Niger
- Nicaragua (male only)
- Samoa
- Singapore
- United States
  - Mississippi
  - Puerto Rico
- Zambia

=== Unknown age ===
- Cook Islands
- Kiribati
- Niue
- Tokelau
- Tuvalu

== Religious law ==
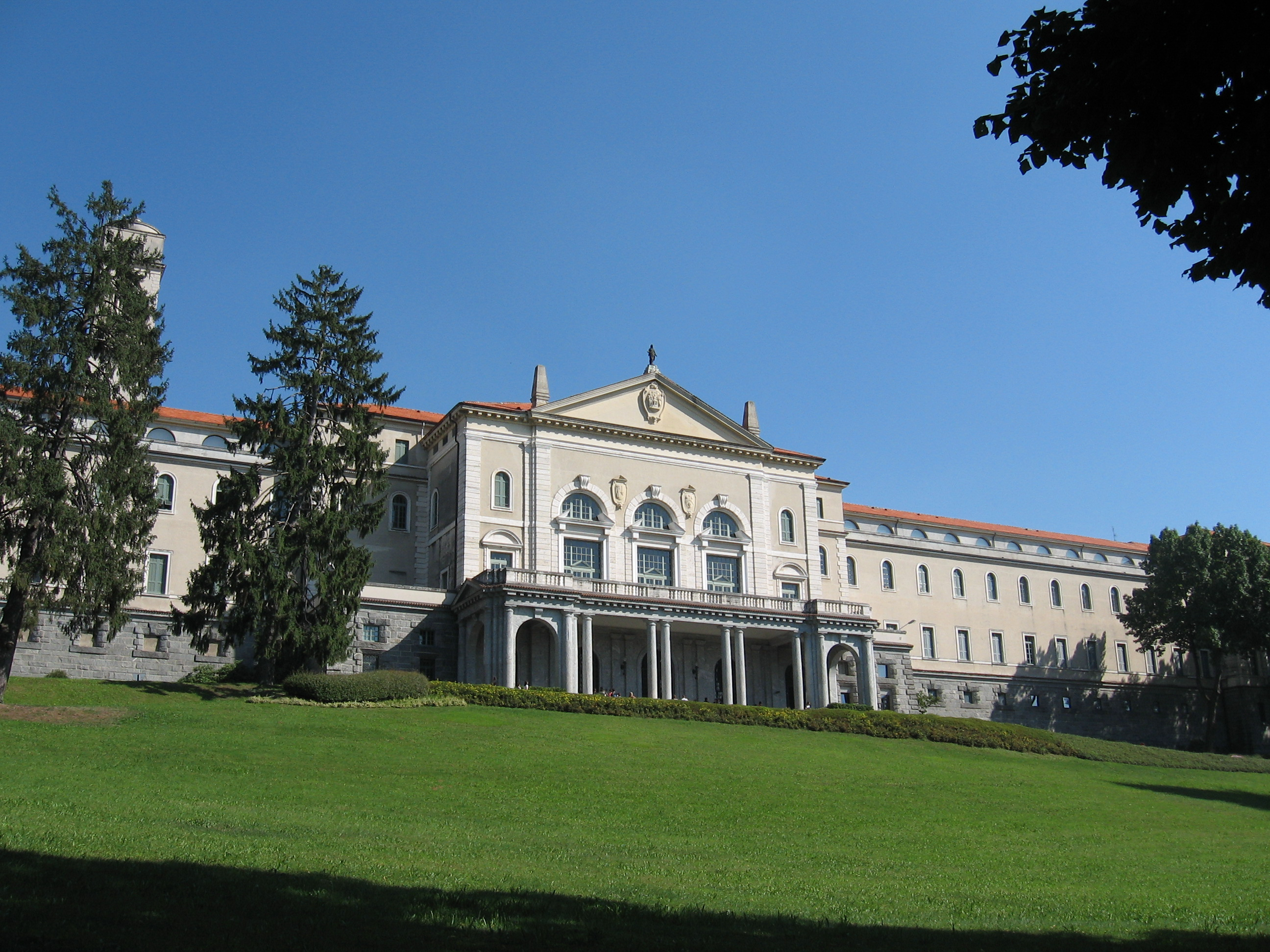
Seminary of the Roman Catholic Archdiocese of Milan

Religions have their own rules as to the age of maturity, when a child is regarded to be an adult, at least for ritual purposes:

- Christianity (only the Roman Catholic Church): 18 years. However, the age majority for religious purposes comes after the sacrament of Confirmation, which usually occurs at age 15 or 16 for both males and females. Seminaries in the Catholic Church are divided into minor seminaries for teenagers and major seminaries for adults.
- Islam: Some schools rule based on the limit being 16 years for both males and females, some 15 for males and 14 for females, and some 15 for both. There is also a distinction in Islamic law between the state of adulthood and the ability to have sexual intercourse.
- Judaism: The age of majority is 13 years for boys (bar mitzvah) and 12 years for girls (bat mitzvah) for religious purposes. However, Jewish law follows (according to some interpretations) the law of the land if there is a difference, such as in marriage age.
- Baháʼí Faith: The spiritual age of maturity for every person born into a Baháʼí family is 16. At 16, the person is old enough to decide for themselves what religion they want to be, so they could decide to stay a Baháʼí or choose a different path. At this age, Baháʼís are considered youth (as opposed to children before 15). Baháʼí youth are 15–21 years old. Once a Baháʼí turns 15, if they declare themselves a Baháʼí, they are expected to recite a daily obligatory prayer and participate in the fast. Baha'is can vote in Baha'i elections once they turn 18 (this was recently changed from 21).

== Effects ==
- End of the parental authority and guardianship (in some legal systems it causes the pre-end of said institutions).
- Right to be considered legally capable.
- Right to freely manage and dispose of their goods, buy and sell properties and sign rental contracts.
- Right to inherit, manage the inheritance and, in countries where testaments exist, the possibility of testament.
- Right to receive bank credits and have bank accounts.
- Right to demand public authority.
- Possibility of being sued for not paying debts or other contracts.
- Possibility of being a member of the jury (in countries where trials use a jury).
- Possibility of being sued for child support and medical bills due to the birth of a child.

In some countries, reaching the age of majority carries other rights and obligations, although in other countries, these rights and obligations may be had before or after reaching the aforementioned age.

- Right to vote and to run for government office: although in some countries the minimum voting age may be lower and in other countries there are age restrictions to be elected to certain public offices.
- Right to drive a car: it may vary in some countries with respect to the age of majority.
- Right to drink alcoholic drinks and to smoke tobacco or marijuana: In some countries, the legal drinking age and the smoking age differ from the age of adulthood.
- Right to buy and possess firearms or guns.
- Right to work, pursue trade, profession or industry: may vary in some countries with respect to the age of majority.
- Right to freely leave the country (in some European countries like Italy, minors can leave the country unimpeded).
- In trials, the possibility of being treated as an adult, found guilty and sentenced to prison or being executed (in retentionist jurisdictions): It may vary in some countries with respect to the age of majority.

== See also ==
- Adultism
- Adolescence
- Age of candidacy
- Age of consent
- Age of criminal responsibility
- Capacity (law)
- Emancipation of minors
- Legal drinking age
- Legal smoking age
- Legal working age
- List of enlistment age by country
- Marriageable age
- Mature minor doctrine
- Secular coming-of-age ceremony
- Voting age
- Youth rights
- Youth suffrage
- Youth
