= Smokefree Environments and Regulated Products (Smoked Tobacco) Amendment Act 2022 =

Act of Parliament in New Zealand

New Zealand Parliament
- Royal assent: 16 December 2022
- Commenced: 1 January 2023

Legislative history
- Introduced by: Ayesha Verrall
- First reading: 27 July 2022
- Voting summary: 109 voted for; 10 voted against
- Second reading: 6 December 2022
- Voting summary: 74 voted for; 41 voted against
- Third reading: 13 December 2022
- Voting summary: 76 voted for; 43 voted against

Amended by
- Smokefree Environments and Regulated Products Amendment Act 2024

Related legislation
- Smokefree Environments and Regulated Products Act 1990; Smoke-free Environments Amendment Act 2003
- Status: Amended

The Smokefree Environments and Regulated Products (Smoked Tobacco) Amendment Act 2022 is an act of the New Zealand Parliament that sought to combat smoking by limiting the number of retailers allowed to sell smoked tobacco products; banning the sale of smoked tobacco products to anyone born on or after 1 January 2009; and discouraging the consumption of smoked tobacco products. The bill passed its third reading on 13 December 2022 and received royal assent on 16 December 2022. The new National-led coalition government announced in late November 2023 that they intended to repeal the legislation. Three parts of the Smokefree legislation was repealed on 5 March 2024.

== Key provisions ==
The Smokefree Environments and Regulated Products (Smoked Tobacco) Amendment Act amends the Smokefree Environments and Regulated Products Act 1990 by making three changes:

1. Reducing the number of retail outlets allowed to sell smoked tobacco products.
2. Reducing the amount of nicotine allowed in smoked tobacco products.
3. Prohibiting the sale of tobacco products to anyone born on or after 1 January 2009.

Key provisions include:

- Prohibiting smoking and vaping in workplaces, certain public enclosed areas, registered schools, early childhood education and care centres, and vehicles carrying children.
- Restricting the sale of smoked tobacco products to approved smoked tobacco retailers, who must apply to the director-general of Health. Violators are subject to a maximum fine of $400,000.
  - In accordance with the principles of the Treaty of Waitangi, the director-general of Health must consult with the Māori Health Authority, iwi-Māori partnership board or any affected Māori about approving smoked tobacco retailers in an area.
- Specialist vape retailers must apply to the director-general for approval.
- General vape retailers must inform the director-general that they are selling vaping products.
- Prohibiting the sale and delivery of smoked tobacco products to anyone born on and after 1 January 2009 (the "smokefree generation"). Violators are subject to fine not exceeding $150,000.
- Prohibiting the supply of smoked tobacco products to the "smokefree generation".
- Internet sites selling smoked tobacco products must display health and prohibition warnings.
- Automatic vending machines selling smoked tobacco products must not be located in a public space.
- Empowers the minister of health to prescribe the amount of nicotine allowed in smoked tobacco products.

== History ==
=== Background ===
On 9 December 2021, Associate Health Minister Ayesha Verrall confirmed that the New Zealand Government would seek to fulfill the Smokefree 2025 goal by introducing new legislation banning anyone under the age of 14 from legally purchasing tobacco for the rest of their lives. Older generations will only be permitted to buy tobacco products with very low-levels of nicotine while fewer retailers will be allowed to sell tobacco products. The Government's announcement was welcomed by the Green Party and several health experts and academical researchers including New Zealand Medical Association chair Alistair Humphrey, Health Coalition Aotearoa smokefree expert advisory group chair Sally Liggins, and University of Auckland Associate Dean of Pacific Collin Tukuitonga, who stated that it would deal with the health effects of smoking on the public including the Māori and Pasifika communities. By contrast, the opposition ACT Party's health spokesperson Karen Chhour criticised the proposed law, arguing that prohibition did not work and would create a black market for tobacco products.

=== First reading ===
The Bill passed its first reading on 27 July 2022 by a margin of 109 to 10 votes. While the bill was supported by the governing Labour Party, the allied Green Party, the opposition National, and Māori parties, it was opposed by the libertarian ACT Party. Supporters of the bill including its sponsor Verrall, fellow Labour Members of Parliament (MPs) Tangi Utikere, and Tracey McLellan, argued that it would address the harmful impact of smoking on the public particularly the Māori community.

National Party MPs of including Shane Reti, Matt Doocey, Simon Watts, and Michael Woodhouse expressed support for the Bill's goal to combat the health effects of smoking but expressed concerned about its experimental nature and enforceability. Green MP Chlöe Swarbrick and Māori Party co-leader Debbie Ngarewa-Packer supported the bill's efforts to limit the availability of tobacco products but questioned the effectiveness of reducing nicotine content and prohibition respectively. The ACT Party's deputy-leader Brooke van Velden opposed the bill on the grounds that it limited individual rights and argued that measures to limit smoking could increasing organised crime.

=== Select Committee ===
The Health Committee released its final report on the Smokefree Environments and Regulated Products (Smoked Tobacco) Amendment Bill on 28 November 2022. The majority of its members recommended that the legislation be passed with amendments including:

- Specifying that Clause 19(2) comes into force on 1 January 2027. This would ensure that the prohibition of sales to individuals under 18 years old would remain until the smokefree generation provisions began on 1 January 2027.
- Clarifying the criteria for approving a smoked tobacco and specialist vape retailers.
- Clarifying the application process for smoked tobacco retailers.
- Setting the criteria for setting the maximum number of tobacco retailers based on population size, the number of people, geographical nature of the area, and the views of local residents.
- Setting a cap of 600 tobacco retailers across New Zealand.
- Extending the notification to all notifiable products including vaping and smoked tobacco products. The sellers of all notifiable products will also be required to renew their notifications annually.
- Limiting the number of automatic vending machines selling tobacco products.
- Clarifying the visa status of smoke tobacco product sellers.
- Clarifying that manufacturers and importers will be responsible for cover testing requirements of smoked tobacco products.
- Specifying a maximum limit of 0.8mg/g of nicotine for any smoked tobacco product, which will come into effect 27 months after the legislation commenced.
- Removing the requirement for the Crown to prove a men reas element (mental element to the offending) selling, manufacturing, and importing smoked tobacco products after their approval has been suspended.
- Increasing the fine imposed on manufacturers and importers for failing to conduct certain tests from NZ$10,000 to NZ$50,000.
- Creating an offence for failing to conduct certain tests.
- Introducing regulations to regulate cigarette filters.

The National Party expressed concerns that reducing the number of licensed tobacco retailers to 600 and the two-year adjustment timeframe would hurt the livelihoods of many small businesses. National also opined that the "smokefree generation" concept had not been applied widely internationally and that more time was needed to assess its effectiveness. While the National Party supported the Bill's denicotisation provisions, it expressed concern that the Bill's vaping provisions were insufficient to addressing the problem. Due to these concerns, the National Party withdrew its support for the legislation. Subsequent youth survey data placed these concerns within the wider context of tobacco-control. The ASH Year 10 Snapshot Survey reported that regular vaping among Year 10 students declined for the fourth consecutive year in 2025, falling from 14.1% in 2024 to 11.2% in 2025, after peaking at 20.2% in 2021. The same survey reported that daily smoking among Year 10 students remained low, at 1.1% in 2025.

The ACT Party opposed the Bill on the grounds that limits on the nicotine levels in tobacco products would increase smuggling and organised crime. The party also disagreed with empowering the Director-General of Health to determine which retailers should be allowed to sell cigarettes'.

=== Second reading ===
The Smokefree Environments Bill passed its second reading on 6 December 2022 by a margin of 74 to 41. The majority of parliamentarians also voted to adopt the amendments recommended by the Health Committee. The Bill was supported by Labour and the Greens and opposed by the National and ACT parties. Labour and Green MPs including the bill's sponsor Ayesha Verrall, Tangi Utikere, Tracey McLellan, Chlöe Swarbrick, and Neru Leavasa argued that the Bill would help reduce smoking addiction and its adverse health effects on vulnerable and impoverished communities. National and ACT MPs including Shane Reti, Harete Hipango, Brooke van Velden, Penny Simmonds, and Maureen Pugh argued that the Bill would hurt the economic livelihood of small businesses and that banning tobacco would encourage black marketing and other criminal activities.

=== In committee ===
On 8 December 2022, Parliament voted to amend the Smokefree Environments Bill to include herbal smoking products within the scope of the Bill. This loophole is intended to prevent nicotine from being added to herbal smoking products. The majority of MPs also rejected National health spokesperson Reti's proposed amendments to the Bill.

=== Third reading ===
On 13 December, the Smokefree Environment Bill passed its third and final reading by a margin of 76 to 43 votes. While Labour, the Greens, and the Māori Party voted in favour of the Bill, it was opposed by the National and ACT parties. Verrall talked about the harm caused by tobacco to communities. Reti criticised the Government for targeting retailers rather than pursuing a denicotisation strategy. Green MP Swarbrick questioned the National Party's commitment to evidence-based policy-making and combating tobacco addiction. ACT Deputy Leader Van Velden described the Bill as "nanny-State prohibition" that would cause more harm and crime in the community. Māori Party co-leader Debbie Ngarewa-Packer argued that the Bill would reduce tobacco harm among young people and the Māori community. The Guardian reported that the legislation is believed to internationally be the first to set "an annually rising legal smoking age".

== Repeal ==
The National Party signed a coalition agreement with the ACT Party and New Zealand First on 24 November 2023. The agreement stated that the parties would repeal the Act. The National Party had not included repeal in its election manifesto, but the ACT and New Zealand First parties had committed to repealing it. Prime Minister Christopher Luxon claimed that the smokefree legislation was flawed on the grounds that it allegedly discriminated against people on the basis of age and that restrictions on the sale of tobacco products would create a black market and encourage ram-raiding. Written into the coalition agreement was the repeal of the smokefree legislation. During the election campaign, National had proposed a foreign buyers' tax for New Zealand real estate, which had to be scrapped due to opposition by New Zealand First, leaving a significant funding shortfall in their tax plan. On 25 November, National's incoming Finance Minister Nicola Willis revealed that her party agreed to repealing the smokefree legislation so that this tax shortfall could be covered; the smokefree legislation had been predicted to cause a NZ$1 billion tax shortfall per year.

On 1 January 2023, parts of the Smokefree Environments and Regulated Products (Smoked Tobacco) Amendment Act 2022 which were not appealed came into effect as well as other parts on 1 October 2023.

On 27 February 2024, Associate Health Minister Casey Costello confirmed that the Government would introduce the Smokefree Environments and Regulated Products Amendment Bill to repeal the three components of the smokefree legislation: the retail reduction scheme, de-nicotisation and the smokefree generation measures. The Smokefree Amendment Bill passed its third reading on 28 February 2024 and entered into force on 6 March 2024. Labour leader Chris Hipkins crticised the repeal, stating that the Government lacked a moral compass and was serving the interests of the tobacco lobby. He said that the repeal legislation would increase smoking in New Zealand and would worsen Māori health outcomes.

=== Domestic reaction ===
The proposed repeal was criticised by former health minister and Labour's health spokesperson Ayesha Verrall, University of Otago tobacco control researcher Richard Edwards, New Zealand's Action for Smokefree 2025 committee chair Robert Beaglehole, and Māori health organisation Hāpai Te Hauora, who argued that the repeal would have adverse effects on the health and well-being of New Zealanders particularly Māori. Māori health researcher Lisa Te Morenga, who co-chairs the Health Coalition Aotearoa, called the repeal a "completely backwards step" and pointed to other countries being in the process of emulating the legislative approach of the legislation. Public health doctor and academic Collin Tukuitonga called the government's move "immoral and embarrassing internationally" as well as "unethical", pointing to lower-income communities having to live with worse health outcomes as their smoking rates are higher.

In December 2023, anti-smoking campaigners submitted a 45,000-strong petition to Parliament denouncing the proposed repeal of Smokefree legislation. In early February 2024, Beverly Te Huia and the smokefree coalition Te Rōpū Tupeka Kore (including Sue Taylor, Hone Harawira and Shane Bradbrook) filed two separate Waitangi Tribunal claims opposing the Government's proposed repeal of Smokefree legislation. In response to the legal challenges, NZ First MP and cabinet minister Shane Jones reiterated his threat to review the Waitangi Tribunal's scope and claimed that voters had supported a reset.

In late February 2024, University of Otago public health researcher Janet Hoek criticised the introduction of the Government's repeal legislation, saying that it would overturn efforts made to encourage smokers to quit smoking and discourage young people from taking up smoking. Hoek also criticised the Government's decision not to allow a conscience vote on the repeal legislation or to expose it to a select committee or Waitangi Tribunal hearing. Otago University associate professor and ASPIRE Research Centre co-director Andrew Waa said the repeal would undermine efforts to achieve a Smokefree Aotearoa and cause thousands of "unnecessary" deaths, particularly among Māori. By contrast, ACT spokesperson Todd Stephenson welcomed the repeal of the Smokefree legislation, which he described as a "dopey experiment in prohibition". He also said that an attempted crackdown on smoking would have created a black market for criminal gangs.

On 25 February 2024, a 1News-Verian poll found that 60% of respondents opposed the Government's removal of smokefree legislation. 30% supported the repeal while 10% stated that they did not know or refused to answer the question. The poll surveyed 1,002 eligible voters between 10 and 14 February. Segments most opposed to the smokefree repeal were Green and Labour parties supporters, Wellington residents, women aged 18 to 49, those with an annual household income over NZ$150,000, European New Zealanders, and university graduates. Segments most supportive of the smokefree repeal were ACT and National parties supporters, men aged 35 to 54, Auckland residents and non-university graduates.

=== International reaction ===
The BBC reported that Rishi Sunak's ministry adopted its idea for their smokefree policy from New Zealand's legislation. It was confirmed that Sunak's position remained unchanged following New Zealand's policy u-turn. The British policy approach is the same, with anyone then aged 14 or under never being able to buy cigarettes.

The New York Times praised the liberal approach taken by the previous Labour government and focused on the foreign buyers tax income lost in the coalition agreement that had to be covered by other tax revenue as the reason for scrapping the smokefree legislation. The American news magazine Time outlined that the move was seen as a win for the tobacco industry.

The Agence France-Presse (AFP) opinioned that the incoming government "will jettison world-leading measures to stub out smoking". An article in the Indian newspaper Hindustan Times focussed on the motivation for the reversal of the smokefree legislation to fund tax cuts.

In November 2025, the biennial Conference of the Parties to the WHO Framework Convention on Tobacco Control in Geneva awarded New Zealand the "Dirty Ashtray" for what it regarded as "poor progress" in tobacco control," citing the repeal of the Smokefree legislation, sabotaging indigenous-led tobacco control initiatives, and rising vaping rates among young people. The conference also cited New Zealand falling from 2nd to 53rd place in the 2025 Global Tobacco Industry Interference Index and the influence of tobacco corporate interests in lawmaking.

== See also ==
- Smoking in New Zealand
- Tobacco-free generation policies
