= Smokefree Environments and Regulated Products Act 1990 =

Act of Parliament in New Zealand

Smokefree Environments and Regulated Products Act

New Zealand Parliament
- Long title: An Act — (a) To reduce the exposure of people who do not themselves smoke to any detrimental effect on their health caused by smoking by others; and (b) To regulate the marketing, advertising, and promotion of tobacco products, whether directly or through the sponsoring of other products, services, or events; and (c) To monitor and regulate the presence of harmful constituents in tobacco products and tobacco smoke; and (d) To establish a Health Sponsorship Council
- Royal assent: 28 August 1990

Amended by
- Smokefree Environments Amendment Act 2003
- Status: Amended

The Smokefree Environments and Regulated Products Act 1990 (originally the Smoke-free Environments Act 1990) is an act of the New Zealand Parliament. It placed restrictions on smoking in indoor spaces, banned smoking on public transport and established the Health Sponsorship Council. The bill was introduced by Helen Clark, then Minister of Health and later Prime Minister, who would later say the law was "one of my proudest achievements as a politician". It was amended by the Smoke-free Environments Amendment Act 2003, which eliminated smoking in workspaces, by the Smokefree Environments and Regulated Products (Vaping) Amendment Act 2020, which renamed the Act and brought it "up to date", and by the Smokefree Environments and Regulated Products (Smoked Tobacco) Amendment Act 2022.

== See also ==
- Smoking in New Zealand
