= Tobacco Control Act of the Maldives 2010 =

2010 Maldivian law regulating tobacco

Tobacco Control Act

People's Majlis
- Territorial extent: Maldives
- Enacted by: People's Majlis
- Assented to by: President Mohamed Nasheed
- Commenced: 18 August 2010
- Status: In force

The Tobacco Control Act of the Maldives (Law: 15/2010) (Dhivehi: ދުންފަތް ކޮންޓްރޯލުކުރުމާބެހޭ ޤާނޫނު) was enacted by the People's Majlis and signed into law by president Mohamed Nasheed on 18 August 2010. The act controls the use of tobacco including prohibition of growing and advertising tobacco and tobacco products, how such products can be imported and exported, how they can be wholesaled and retailed.

== First amendment ==
On 14 October 2024, president Mohamed Muizzu announced a complete ban on vapes. The new amendment was brought forward to the People's Majlis by MP North Henveiru Ahmed Aifan on 23 October. It was subsequently reviewed by the Committee on Social Affairs, where it was later accepted. The amendment was ratified by president Muizzu on 13 November 2024. This new amendment changes the legal minimum age for using tobacco from 18 to 21, imposes fines for business and individuals for importing, distributing, selling, selling to minors. The amendment fully came into effect on 15 November 2024.

== Second amendment ==
The Second Amendment to the Tobacco Control Act of the Maldives, ratified by president Mohamed Muizzu on 21 May 2025, introduced a generational ban on tobacco. The amendment prohibits the sale, purchase and use of tobacco products by persons born on or after 1 January 2007, raises age-related sales restrictions, and expands prohibitions to include e-cigarettes and related devices. It also strengthens penalties for importers, distributors and retailers who violate advertising, sale and possession rules, and requires age verification by vendors. The amendment was passed by the People’s Majlis in May 2025 and published in the Government Gazette; it entered into effect on 1 November 2025. Advocates described the measure as a national “tobacco endgame” policy intended to protect future generations and reduce tobacco-related morbidity. International health organisations including Action on Smoking and Health and UNICEF widely welcomed the reform as a significant public-health milestone.

== See also ==
- Smoking in the Maldives
- Tobacco-free generation policies
