= Smoke-free Environments Amendment Act 2003 =

Act of Parliament in New Zealand

New Zealand Parliament

Legislative history
- Passed: 3 December 2003
- Status: Current legislation

The Smoke-free Environments Amendment Act 2003 is an Act of Parliament in New Zealand that prohibits smoking in all workplaces including offices, clubs, pubs, restaurants, airports, and schools.

It was passed by the Parliament of New Zealand on 3 December 2003 and came into force progressively starting 11 December 2003. A total indoor smoking ban was in effect within one year.

== Legislative history ==
=== Background and original policy intent ===
New Zealand established some smoking restrictions in indoor spaces in 1990, including on public transport. Smoking on domestic flights had already been illegal since 1988, and on international flights from 1996.

The Smoke-free Environments (Enhanced Protection) Amendment Bill, amending the Smoke-free Environments Act 1990, was originally introduced as a private member's bill by Mauri Pacific MP Tuku Morgan in July 1999. After Morgan did not win re-election later that year, the Bill was picked up by Labour MP Steve Chadwick for its first reading on 10 May 2000 before being transferred to fellow Labour MP Judy Keall. Chadwick resumed responsibility for the Bill after Keall declined to seek re-election in 2002.

The bill as originally drafted proposed to extend the provisions of the Smoke-free Environments Act by banning all smoking on school grounds and in school buildings.

=== Amendments ===
Further restrictions on workplace smoking were proposed through amendments, though a full smoking ban in licensed premises was not originally included. A 2001 supplementary order paper, in Keall's name, proposed further amendments, included new provisions to require at least 50% of a licensed premise to be smokefree. The bill, through all its iterations, did not alter the right of smokers to smoke in their private homes and private vehicles.

The bill and supplementary order paper were considered by the Health Committee for nearly three years. In its report of March 2003, the committee recommended stronger smoke-free measures. It proposed Parliament prohibit smoking in all indoor workplaces, including bars, casinos, members’ clubs and restaurants. These measures ultimately became law.

As much as public health, the policy arguments became focused on workplace relations and safety. The committee stated the purpose of the law would be "to extend the protections for workers, volunteers and the public in the Smoke-free Environments Act 1990 particularly against exposure to second-hand smoke, to reduce the harm caused to individuals by their smoking, to further restrict minors’ access to smoking products and the visual influence of smoking in front of minors, and to provide limited enforcement powers." The amended bill would require employers to "take all reasonable steps" to ensure workplaces are smokefree, except for dedicated smoking rooms. The committee received 397 submissions, not including over 7,500 form submissions, and heard 112 oral submissions across two parliamentary terms.

In its consideration by the Committee of the whole House through August to November 2003, amendments by Green Party MP Sue Kedgley were agreed that removed proposed instant fines of up to $400 for individual smokers (infringement provisions of $4000 for non-compliant proprietors remained) and additionally banned sales of toys that imitate the act of smoking to children.

Amendments proposed by United Future leader Peter Dunne, which have would overturned the smoking ban and instead required bar owners to meet ventilation standards, were lost. An attempt by Dunne to have the bill returned to the Health Committee for further consideration was also lost. Amendments from National Party MP Richard Worth to exclude cigar bars from the legislation were lost. National MPs Katherine Rich, David Carter, John Carter, Maurice Williamson, Simon Power, Lindsay Tisch, and Pansy Wong proposed amendments that would have omitted specified licensed premises in their local communities from being covered by the bill; these were ruled out of order by the chairperson Clem Simich because they amounted to private bills rather than public bills. Members recalled the Speaker to confirm this ruling; Speaker Jonathan Hunt upheld the ruling.

=== Third reading and vote ===
In her third reading speech in Parliament on 3 December 2003, the bill's sponsor Steve Chadwick said the intention was to improve health throughout the country. Chadwick's main claim was that the bill would save the lives of about 388 New Zealanders a year who would otherwise have died from inhaling second hand smoke. She said it would reduce allied disabilities and hospital admissions, as well as discourage non-smokers from becoming smokers. Members speaking against the legislation criticised it for being "anti-business" and for taking away "personal freedoms" from New Zealanders. Opponents also predicted the law would either be ignored or would cost the hospitality industry $78 million per year, and labelled it "political correctness gone mad."

MPs had a conscience vote on the issue, deciding 68–52 in favour of the bill in its third reading on 3 December 2003. All Labour, Green, and Progressive Party MPs voted in support. Most National MPs (except doctors Paul Hutchison and Lynda Scott), New Zealand First MPs (except Pita Paraone) and all ACT New Zealand MPs voted against.

== Enforcement ==
The first successful prosecution under the Smokefree Environments Amendment Act came in December 2005 at the Timaru District Court. The defendant, Geoff Mulvihill, received a NZ$9,000 fine (and $6000 in costs) for failing to enforce the legislation in his tavern.

== Legacy ==
One year after the Act was passed, the Asthma and Respiratory Foundation released a report showing that there has been no reduction in the number of bar patrons or bar takings. There has been an increase in the number of non-smokers at bars and cafes. Rural pubs may have suffered a loss of patronage. In 2004, Action on Smoking and Health released a report stating that the proportion of 14- to 16-year-olds who smoked had declined from 28.6% in 1999 to 17.6%, and attributed this in part to the legislation requiring smoke-free school grounds.

== See also ==
- Tobacco in New Zealand
