= Tobacco 21 =

U.S. public health campaign

- Founded: February 2003 (Needham, MA)
- Key goal: Raising the minimum legal sales age for tobacco to 21
- Target products: Cigarettes, vapes, cigars, and other nicotine products
- Lead organization: Preventing Tobacco Addiction Foundation
- Major legislation: Further Consolidated Appropriations Act, 2020 (U.S.)
- Global adoption: United States, Singapore, Sri Lanka, others

Tobacco 21 is a campaign to prevent youth tobacco use in the United States, primarily through laws that raise the minimum legal age to purchase tobacco and nicotine in the United States to 21. It also refers to various federal, state, and local laws based on Tobacco 21's model policy, raising the minimum sales age to 21.

Many tobacconists (also called smoke shops or tobacco shops) also prohibit minors below this age from entering the facility.

== History ==
Tobacco 21 is produced and funded by the Preventing Tobacco Addiction Foundation, a public health nonprofit organization established in 1996. Several national non-profit organizations, including the American Cancer Society in Oregon, had supported raising the tobacco age.

The Tobacco 21 movement emerged in February 2003 when Needham, Massachusetts became the first municipality to enact a law raising the minimum legal sales age to 21.

On December 20, 2019, President Donald Trump signed the 2020 United States federal budget which raised the federal smoking age to 21.

== Rationale ==
Studies show that around 95% of adult smokers tried cigarettes before turning 21, while 80% of them had their first cigarette before their 18th birthday. Adult smokers may supply tobacco products to younger consumers. The National Academies concluded that underage users primarily obtain tobacco from social sources such as friends and relatives, rather than from the illegal commercial market. Tobacco 21 law supporters believe that teenagers have fewer acquaintances aged 21 who could purchase nicotine delivery products for them.

The chosen age limit also has a precedent in the alcohol industry. The U.S.-wide legal age of 21 for the purchase of alcohol products is credited for reduced consumption among young people, as well as decreased alcohol addiction and drunk driving cases, but this claim is widely disputed and further research suggests raising the age had no effect on underage access and drunk driving rates.

== Scientific aspect ==
The major scientific publication in support of Tobacco 21 is the Institute of Medicine's report "Public Health Implications of Raising the Minimum Age of Legal Access to Tobacco Products", which concluded by saying: "if the MLA were raised now to 21 nationwide, there would be approximately 223,000 fewer premature deaths, 50,000 fewer deaths from lung cancer, and 4.2 million fewer years of life lost for those born between 2000 and 2019."

An editorial in the New England Journal of Medicine called Tobacco 21 "An idea whose time has come".

There is mixed scientific evidence on the impact a tobacco-purchase age limit of 21. Older studies, including a review in 2011, provided evidence against the idea that raising the drinking age to 21 has actually saved lives in the long run. In one study, Miron and Tetelbaum (2009) discovered that when the federally coerced and non-coerced states were separated out, any lifesaving effect is no longer statistically or practically significant in the coerced states, and even in the voluntary-adopting states the effect does not seem to last beyond perhaps the first year or two. And while a 2023 study that controlled for state-level differences found that the passage of Tobacco 21 laws is associated with a 2-to-4 percentage-point decline in smoking participation among 18-to-20-year-olds and a spillover effect of a reduction in smoking among youth aged 16–17, a 2024 study found a much weaker effect size (less than one percentage point decline in smoking, vaping, and smokeless tobacco use) for the federal Tobacco 21 law, and no significant effect for state-level Tobacco 21 laws among young adults.

== Endorsements ==
The following organizations have endorsed Tobacco 21 at the national level, either through their own statements or through endorsement of Senate Bill 2100, the federal bill to raise the tobacco age to 21:

- Campaign for Tobacco Free Kids
- American Heart Association
- American Lung Association
- American Medical Association
- Institute of Medicine
- American Academy of Family Physicians
- American Academy of Pediatrics
- Society for Adolescent Health and Medicine
- Counter Tobacco
- Action on Smoking and Health
- Tobacco Control Legal Consortium
- Clearway Minnesota / Minnesotans For A Smoke Free Generation
- Oral Health America
- American Cancer Society Cancer Action Network
- Academic Pediatric Association
- American Pediatric Society
- American Veterans (AMVETS)
- American Public Health Association
- American Congress of Obstetricians and Gynecologists
- Trust for America's Health
- Association of Medical School Pediatric Department Chairs
- First Focus Campaign for Children
- Pediatric Policy Council
- Society for Pediatric Research
- Association of Asian Pacific Community Health Organizations
- Asian Pacific Partners for Empowerment, Advocacy, and Leadership (APPEAL)
- Hawai‘i Medical Service Association
- Coalition for a Tobacco-Free Hawai‘i

== United States ==
=== State and national movement ===
==== Hawaii ====
Hawaii's Tobacco 21 bill was signed by Governor David Ige and raised the legal age to purchase tobacco products, including electronic smoking devices, to 21, beginning on January 1, 2016.

The legislation of this bill arose after the Institute of Medicine released a report explaining that raising the age to 21 would have significant public health benefits. The report estimated that making the minimum age 21 would result in avoiding nearly 250,000 premature deaths and 50,000 fewer deaths from lung cancer among individuals born between 2000 and 2019.

Under the bill, anyone caught breaking the law faces a $10 fine for the first offense and a $50 fine or community service for a second offense. Retailers caught selling to individuals under the age of 21 pay penalties ranging from $500 to $2,000.

A press release on the governor's website explained the decision by referencing that in the United States, 95 percent of adults smokers begin smoking before the age of 21. Almost half of those become regular smokers before the age of 18 and another 25% become regular smokers between the ages of 18 and 21.

==== California ====
California became the second state to implement a statewide Tobacco 21 law. Governor Jerry Brown signed a group of bills on May 4, 2016. The bills were described as the "most expansive" attempt to regulate tobacco use within the state of California in over a decade. The bills were supported by various organizations and medical groups including the American Heart Association, American Cancer Society, American Lung Association, and California Medical Association. The bill was approved in a special health care session and became effective on June 9, 2016.

==== Washington, D.C. ====
On October 1, 2018, Washington, D.C., raised the legal age of buying tobacco to 21. This was paired with raising the tax on cigarettes by 68% – to $4.94.

==== Alaska ====
As of 2023, Alaska does not enforce the federal Tobacco 21 policy. State law mandates a minimum age of 19 for the sale of nicotine and tobacco products.

Bipartisan efforts have been made to raise the state smoking age. On September 8, 2022, Governor Mike Dunleavy vetoed SB 45, which proposed increasing the smoking age from 19 to 21, as well as levying a 35% wholesale price tax on electronic smoking devices. On March 1, 2023, Senate President Gary Stevens introduced SB 89, which would raise the smoking age to 21 and tax electronic smoking devices at 25% of their retail price.

==== Arizona ====
In the state of Arizona, legislation was enacted that increased the minimum age at which individuals may purchase or possess tobacco products and vaping products from 18 to 21 years of age. This legal change, effective from 26 September 2025, reflected a state-level adjustment to the federal minimum sales age of 21.

==== Maryland ====
In the state of Maryland, the state government had elected to remove its active-duty military exemption to its Tobacco 21 restrictions, a measure that came into effect on the October 1, 2024.

==== National minimum age increase ====
On December 20, 2019, as a part of the Further Consolidated Appropriations Act, 2020, the Federal Food, Drug, and Cosmetic Act was amended, raising the federal minimum age for sale of tobacco products in the US from 18 to 21. This legislation (known as "Tobacco 21" or "T21") was effective immediately, and it is now illegal for a retailer to sell any tobacco product—including cigarettes, cigars, and e-cigarettes—to anyone under 21 across the United States. The new federal minimum age of sale applies to all retail establishments and persons with no exceptions. Some commentators have condemned the act for its questionable legality, considering it unconstitutional in violating a state's right to choose its own laws regarding setting an age for certain legal capacities, such as the ability to purchase tobacco. In August 2024, the U.S. Food and Drug Administration announced a final rule that raises the minimum age for certain restrictions on tobacco product sales.

In August 2024, the U.S. Food and Drug Administration issued a final rule which became effective on 30 September 2024, aligning its regulations with the federal minimum sales age of 21 by (I) raising the threshold for photo-ID checks from under 27 to under 30, (II) limiting vending machines to locations where persons under 21 are not present or permitted, and (III) updating self-service display provisions to apply only in 21+ facilities.

=== Local movements ===
==== Needham ====
In 2005, Needham, Massachusetts became the first jurisdiction worldwide to pass and enact a Tobacco 21 policy.

==== New York City ====
In November 2013, New York City enacted legislation that raised the age to purchase tobacco products to 21, and also set a minimum price of $10.50 per pack of cigarettes, among other provisions. The law went into effect on May 18, 2014. The bill came with significant penalties for those who do not comply with the law. Failure to post required signage can result in fines of up to $500. Sales of cigarettes, other tobacco products or electronic cigarettes to people under age 21 can result in New York City fines of up to $1,000 for the first violation and any other violation found that same day, and up to $2,000 for the second violation and any subsequent violation within three years. A second violation may result in revocation of the cigarette retail dealer license. New York State may impose additional fines and penalties for sales of these products to people under age 18.

==== Boston ====
In December 2015, Boston followed New York City by passing an ordinance to raise the tobacco sales age to 21. Boston's Tobacco 21 law went into effect on February 15, 2016.

==== Chicago ====
In March 2016, Chicago passed its Tobacco 21 ordinance. The law went into effect on July 1, 2016.

==== Kansas City ====
Kansas City approved its Tobacco 21 bill on November 19, 2015, and quickly put it into effect a week later on November 26.

==== Springfield, Missouri ====
Springfield, Missouri approved the local Tobacco 21 bill on July 15, 2019, which went into effect the next day.

==== Cleveland ====
In December 2015, Cleveland passed a local ordinance to ban the sale of tobacco and nicotine products to any persons under the age of 21. The law went into effect on April 14, 2016.

==== San Francisco ====
In March 2016, San Francisco joined the ranks of major American cities to pass an ordinance to raise the tobacco and nicotine sales age to 21. The ordinance went into effect on June 1, 2016. Eight days later, California's Tobacco 21 bill went into effect statewide.

==== Brookline, Massachusetts ====
In March 2024, the Massachusetts Supreme Judicial Court upheld the 'tobacco-free generation' bylaw of Brookline, Massachusetts, which prohibits the sale of tobacco products to persons born on or after January 1, 2000. The bylaw was adopted in 2020 and took effect in 2021.

== International movements ==
=== Australia ===
In Australia, the Minderoo Foundation runs Tobacco21.com.au and advocates for the smoking age in Australia to be raised to 21. The Australian state of Tasmania has considered raising its smoking age from 18 to 21 but has faced some opposition from the Tasmanian Liberal government. In 2024, the South Australian government considered a 'tobacco-free generation' proposal that would have prohibited the sale and supply of tobacco products to individuals born on or after 1 January 2007. A bill on the policy passed the state's Legislative Council in September 2024.

=== New Zealand ===
In February 2024, New Zealand's parliament repealed provisions that had prohibited the sale of tobacco to individuals born on or after 1 January 2009, in addition to a measure that was passed in 2022 and was scheduled to take effect in July 2024.

=== Canada ===
A similar organization, named Tobacco21.ca, has advocated increasing the smoking age in Canada to 21. On March 1, 2020, Prince Edward Island became the first Canadian province to raise its smoking age from 19 to 21. Prince Edward Island has also implemented legislation prohibiting the sale of flavored tobacco and flavored vaping products, with the exception of tobacco-flavored or unflavored products. In addition, the retail sale of electronic smoking devices is restricted to tobacconist shops.

As of 2025, Prince Edward Island remains the only Canadian jurisdiction with a minimum legal sales age of 21.

=== India ===
In May 2025, the Indian state of Karnataka raised the legal age for the purchase of tobacco products from 18 to 21 years of age. Furthermore, it also implemented a prohibition on hookah bars.

=== Maldives ===
In November 2025, the Maldives initiated the implementation of a generational tobacco ban, which entailed the prohibition of the purchase, use, or sale of tobacco products to individuals born on or after 1 January 2007.

=== Malaysia ===
In 2024, the Malaysian government enacted the Control of Smoking Products for Public Health Act 2024, which did not include the proposed "generational endgame" (GEG) provision. This would have prohibited the purchase of smoking products by individuals born in 2007 or later. However, the ministers responsible for the bill cited constitutional concerns as the reason for omitting the GEG provision.

=== Philippines ===
In 2022, the Philippines' vaping law lowered the minimum age for purchasing e-cigarettes and related products from 21 to 18.

=== Indonesia ===
In July 2024, Indonesia raised the minimum legal age for the purchase of cigarettes from 18 to 21 through the implementation of a health regulation that was signed by President Joko Widodo. The regulation also included a ban on the sale of individual cigarettes.

=== Ireland ===
In November 2024, Ireland completed the passage of the Public Health Amendment Bill 2024, which raises the minimum legal age for the sale of tobacco products to 21. The Act is scheduled to come into force on 1 February 2028.

=== Latvia ===
In January 2024, Latvia's Saeima adopted amendments to raise the minimum age for the purchase of tobacco products, electronic smoking devices and refill containers from 18 to 20, with the new regulations taking effect on 1 January 2025.

=== Mongolia ===
Mongolia's tobacco control law prohibits the sale of tobacco products to persons under the age of 21.

=== Singapore ===
Singapore has progressively increased its minimum legal age for smoking, reaching 21 years in January 2021.

=== United Kingdom ===
Sajid Javid, the former UK Secretary of State for Health and Social Care, advocated for raising smoking age in the United Kingdom to 21. It has been heavily criticized by some commentators. In 2024–2025, the UK government introduced the Tobacco and Vapes Bill, which sought to create a "smoke-free generation" by prohibiting the sale of tobacco products and certain associated products to individuals born on or after 1 January 2009, in addition to implementing further regulations on vaping products.

== Criticism ==
Some have called into question the usefulness of raising the smoking age to 21, pointing to studies showing the ineffectiveness of raising the drinking age to 21 in the long-term for the United States, as it only had a minor effect on teen drinking. Some suggest that the age restriction laws are merely a way to placate critics of Big Tobacco, appeasing them with legislation that may be ineffective or distracting them from other solutions.

== See also ==
- Legal smoking age
- Tobacco-free generation policies
- Tobacco in the United States
