= Shoulder tap (alcohol) =

Act in which a minor asks an adult to purchase alcohol for them

A shoulder tap is a law enforcement strategy that seeks to hold adult alcohol providers accountable for their illegal activities involving minors. These operations specifically target the adults who provide alcohol to underage individuals. To carry out these operations, underage volunteers are recruited, selected, and trained to act as decoys (mystery shoppers for test purchasing). Supervised by an officer, the underage decoy approaches an adult entering a store to buy alcohol and requests that the adult purchase alcohol on their behalf. If the adult complies and makes the purchase for the decoy, law enforcement detains the adult supplier and takes appropriate action.

== Examples ==
The definition of minor and adult vary by jurisdiction depending on the drinking age but is usually between the ages of 18 and 21. Typically, the minor will walk around a convenience store and solicit help from a passing adult stranger, which is also commonly known as a "Hey Mister." A Los Angeles Police Department survey indicated that almost half of minors who attempt to acquire alcohol use this method. Such communities use sting operations to deter adult assistance and promote awareness of the legal consequences of helping minors obtain alcohol.

In 2001, a Mothers Against Drunk Driving (MADD) chapter conducted a small experiment in Massachusetts in which teens stood in front of 15 stores and asked 100 adults apparently over the age of 21 to buy them alcohol; 83 of the adults refused and 17 agreed.

In England and Wales, buying alcohol on behalf of a person under 18 is a summary offence under section 149 of the Licensing Act 2003, punishable by an unlimited fine (level 5 on the standard scale). There is an exception for beer, wine or cider served to a 16- or 17-year-old with a meal at a table.

== See also ==
- Legal drinking age
- Legal smoking age#Enforcement
