= Smoking in New Zealand =

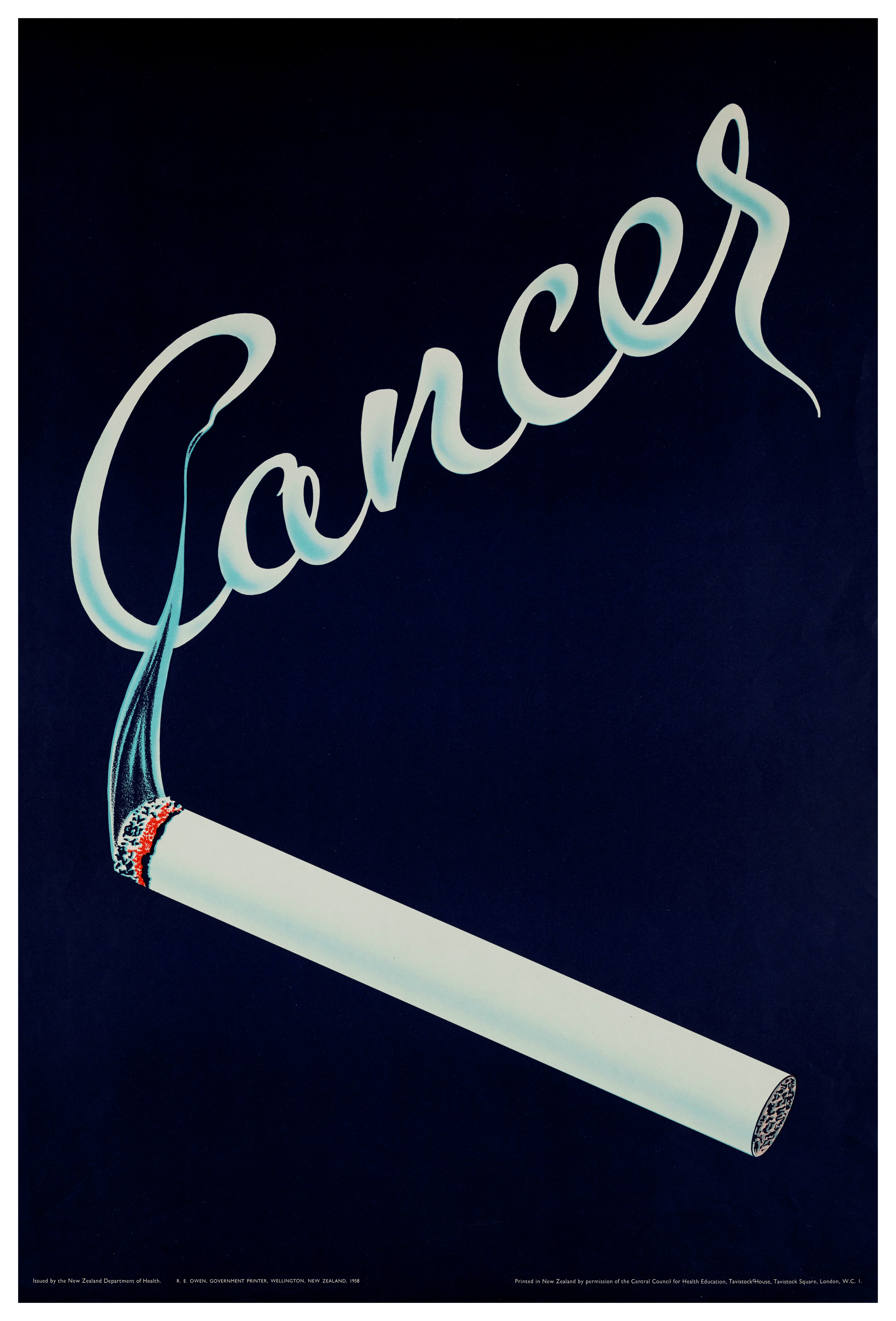
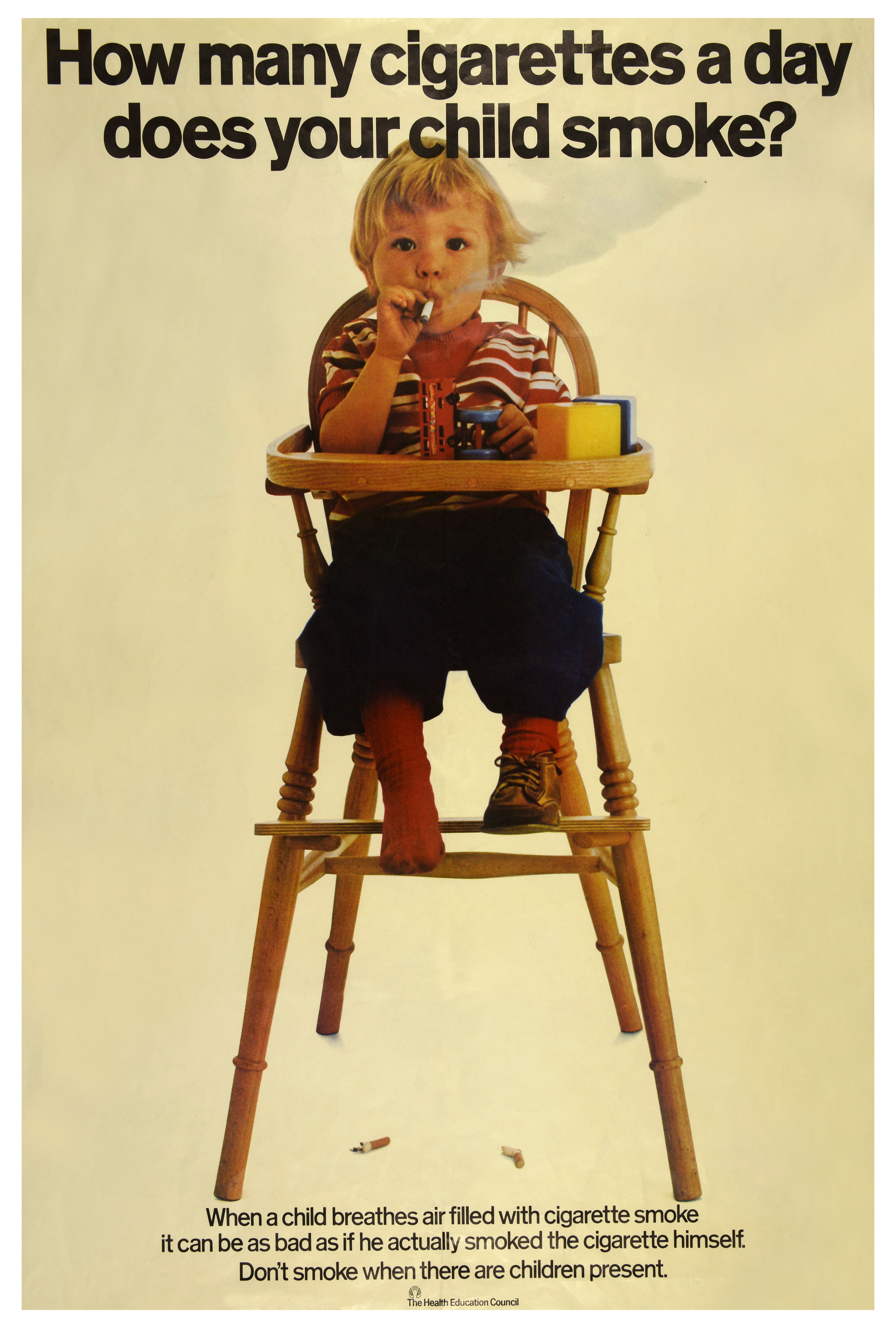
Department of Health anti-smoking posters, 1958 (Source: Archives New Zealand)

The use of tobacco for smoking in New Zealand has been subjected to government regulation for a number of decades. On 10 December 2004, New Zealand became the third country in the world to make all indoor workplaces including bars and restaurants smoke-free. The smoking rate in New Zealand was about 8% as of 2023 when the new government planned to eliminate the nation's smoking ban, in part to fund tax cuts.

== Consumption ==
The number of cigarettes available for consumption, a statistical measure that reflects sales, has generally been decreasing since they peaked at 6.3 billion in 1977 but consumption has remained constant from 2005 through to 2008 at 2.4 billion cigarettes. Over the last 30 years the number of cigarettes that have been available has dropped by 61.5%. The volume of tobacco available for consumption rose to a new high of 904 tonnes and was 83.3 percent higher than the lowest amount recorded in 1985.

Ethnic inequities in smoking prevalence affecting Māori people have become a driver of public health policy.

In 2024/25, daily smoking prevalence was 15.0% among Māori, 10.3% among Pacific peoples, 5.7% among European or other ethnicities and 4.5% among Asian adults; daily vaping prevalence in the same groups was 27.5%, 20.0%, 11.5% and 5.6%, respectively.

=== Vaping ===
Vaping products were first brought under New Zealand’s smokefree regulatory framework in 2020.

Health New Zealand describes nicotine vaping as less harmful than smoking but not harmless, and recommends it only for people seeking to stop smoking.

In the 2025 ASH Year 10 Snapshot Survey of 31,402 students aged 14–15, daily smoking was reported by 1.1%, daily vaping by 7.1%, and 89.4% reported that they had never smoked. Regular vaping had declined from a peak of 20.2% in 2021 to 11.2% in 2025.

Among Year 10 students who reported never smoking, daily vaping declined from 3.7% in 2024 to 3.0% in 2025, while regular vaping declined from 7.6% to 5.7%.

From 17 June 2025, New Zealand prohibited the manufacture, distribution, sale and supply of disposable vaping devices and introduced stronger restrictions on retail displays, advertising, discounts and giveaways; maximum corporate fines for selling regulated products to minors had increased from NZ$10,000 to NZ$100,000 on 18 December 2024.

== Legislation ==
The first building in the world to have a smoke-free policy was the Old Government Building in Wellington in 1876. This policy was enacted over concerns about the threat of fire, as it was the second largest wooden building in the world.

=== Sales ===
The earliest attempt at tobacco control was in 1907, when the government moved to ban tobacco sales to persons under the age of 16, as it was feared that tobacco would "stunt" a minor's growth. However, this law was not enforced until 1988. In 1997, the age restriction was increased to 18 years. Although it is now illegal to sell tobacco products to a minor, a minor may still publicly consume, possess and distribute tobacco to friends without penalty (as opposed to alcohol).

The sale of single cigarettes was banned in early 1998, and cigarettes are required to be sold in packs of no fewer than 20. The New Zealand government's National Drug Policy 2007–2012 seeks to reduce the effects of tobacco use by limiting availability, limiting the use of tobacco, and reducing harm from existing tobacco use.

=== Smoking ban ===
The Smoke-free Environments Act 1990 was passed to prevent the effects of passive smoking on other people by restricting cigarette smoking in places such as workplaces and schools.

Smoking on domestic flights was banned in 1988 and on all international flights as of 1996.

New Zealand passed an amendment to the Smoke-free Environments Act on 3 December 2003 (effective in 2004) which covers all indoor public workplaces and hospitality venues (pubs, bars, nightclubs, charter club bars, restaurants and casinos). Studies have shown very high levels of compliance with the law. Also, the air quality at indoor hospitality venues is very good compared to similar settings in other countries where smoking is still permitted.

Outdoor smoke-free laws cover the grounds of all schools, some council-owned parks (e.g., in South Taranaki and Upper Hutt), the grounds of some hospitals, stadiums and most university campuses. However, these laws are not strictly enforced apart from a polite request from security guards and property owners. The government has not moved to restrict smoking in cars, but has run mass media campaigns that promote smoke-free cars and homes.

=== Advertising ===
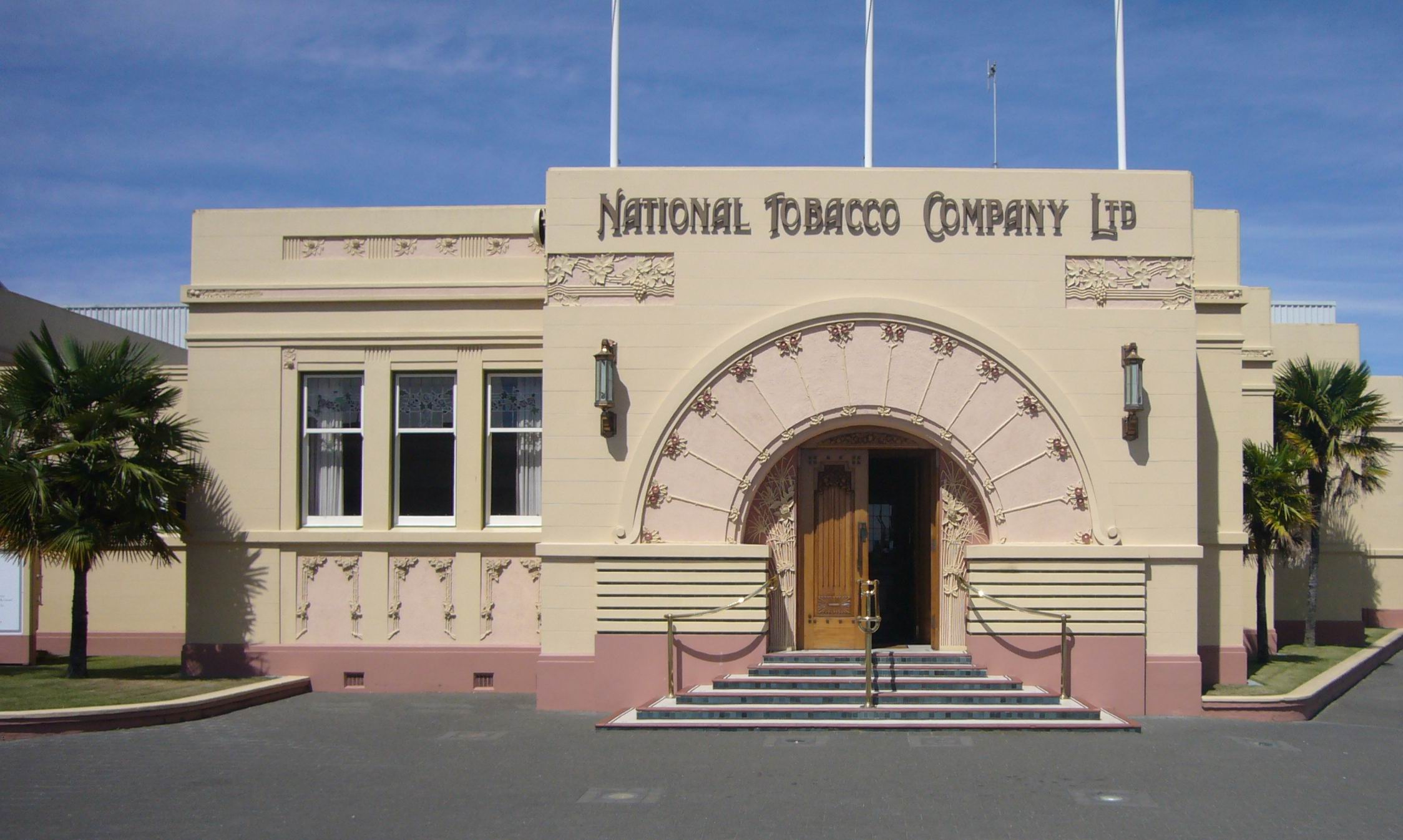
The National Tobacco Company Ltd building in Napier, New Zealand

Cigarette advertising was banned on TV and radio in 1963, on cinemas and billboards in 1971, and in print media in 1990. Tobacco sponsorship was phased out in 1995 and tobacco signage banned from outside shops the same year. Tobacco displays themselves were banned in 2012.

=== Smokefree generation ===
On 9 December 2021, Associate Health Minister Ayesha Verrall confirmed that the Sixth Labour Government would introduce legislation to significantly reduce the availability of tobacco products in the country, by prohibiting their sale to anyone born after 2008 (described as creating a "smokefree generation"), and restricting them to specialty stores only. There would also be a restriction on nicotine content. The announcement was praised by the Green Party and several health leaders including New Zealand Medical Association chair Alistair Humphrey, Health Coalition Aotearoa smokefree expert advisory group chair Sally Liggins, and University of Auckland Associate Dean of Pacific Collin Tukuitonga for addressing the health effects of smoking particularly within the Māori and Pasifika communities. By contrast, ACT health spokesperson Karen Chhour criticised the proposed legislation, stating that prohibition was unworkable and claiming that it would create a black market for tobacco products.

The Smokefree Environments and Regulated Products (Smoked Tobacco) Amendment Act 2022 was passed on 13 December 2022, banning the sale of tobacco to anyone born after 1 January 2009 and reducing the number of retailers allowed to sell tobacco products On 27 November 2023, the incoming National-led coalition government announced it would repeal the Smokefree Environments Amendment Act, in part to fund its promised tax cuts.

== Lobbying ==
On 5 September 2007, Action on Smoking and Health (ASH) called for the removal of tobacco from sale by 2017. Tobacco displays in shops were banned in 2012. Winston Peters, himself a smoker, has long been lobbying for the rights of smokers. In the 2016 New Zealand budget, ACT New Zealand also came out lobbying on behalf of smokers, arguing that although tobacco taxation had doubled in the last five years, smoking rates had only dropped by 1.3 percent.

== Littering ==
National Litter Audit 2019 – top 12 categories by items per 1,000m^{2}

The littering of cigarette butts is recognised as a pervasive issue in New Zealand. In the National Litter Audit conducted in 2019, cigarette butts were the most commonly found items.

A study conducted in urban Wellington in 2011 found that smokers littering cigarette butts was the norm, even when rubbish bins were nearby. Littering of cigarette butts was more common in the evening, where 85.8% of smokers were observed littering, compared with the afternoon, when 68.1% were observed littering. In addition, 73.5% of smokers did not extinguish their butts.

== See also ==
- Anti-smoking movement
- Cannabis in New Zealand
- Health effects of tobacco smoking
- Litter in New Zealand
- Smoke-free Environments Act 1990
- Smokefree Environments and Regulated Products (Smoked Tobacco) Amendment Act 2022
- Tobacco company
- Tobacco industry
