= Smoking in the Maldives =

Smoking in the Maldives has long been part of Maldivian culture, but it has also posed significant public health challenges for the island nation. Tobacco use in the Maldives shows marked gender disparity: as of 2022, an estimated 43.6% of Maldivian men and 3.7% of women aged 15 and above were smokers. Smoking-related illnesses account for about 12.8% of annual deaths nationwide.

In recent years, the government has implemented increasingly strict tobacco control measures, culminating in the world's first generational smoking ban, which took effect in November 2025. Under this law, individuals born on or after January 1, 2007, including tourists, are prohibited from purchasing, possessing, or using tobacco or vaping products.

The Tobacco Control Act and subsequent amendments now regulate not only tobacco sales but also the import, distribution, and use of electronic cigarettes, with penalties of up to Rf. 50,000 for businesses and Rf. 5,000 for individuals violating vape restrictions. These efforts align with the Maldives’ obligations under the WHO Framework Convention on Tobacco Control.

Despite the tough stance against tobacco, surveys indicate that about 26.6% of individuals 15 and older were smokers in 2022, and youth smoking and vaping remain major concerns.

== History ==
During the presidency of Mohamed Amin Didi, he made an unpopular ban on tobacco smoking, which was not favoured by many Maldivians at the time. Later on, the ban was lifted.

Maldives became a party to the WHO Framework Convention on Tobacco Control on 27 February 2005.

According to the Tobacco Control Act (Law 15/2010), smoking is prohibited in most workplaces, public transport, public places, although it permits smoking in designating areas in non-air-conditioned teashops, restaurants, cafés and other food and beverage outlets.

In recent years, the popularity of smoking and vaping had increased in social settings. Vaping had also been introduced to the youth, who were rapidly picking up smoking and vaping.

In 2024, President Mohamed Muizzu signed an amendment to the Tobacco Control Act which banned the import of vapes in the Maldives. The use, distribution and sale of vapes, and related devices was banned in Maldives effective 15 December. This new amendment changed the minimum legal age from 18 to 21. It'll impose fines starting up to MVR 50,000 to businesses or individuals importing vapes and MVR 10,000 for each item, sales of a vape will be MVR 20,000, distributing to minors will be MVR 50,000, and using them will be MVR 5,000. The Maldivian government has also increased duties on tobacco products, leading to prices being more expensive.

In 2025, President Mohamed Muizzu created a public poll on which birth year to start a generational smoking ban with, with many choosing 2007. His cabinet approved a generational ban which prohibits anyone born during or after 2007 from buying tobacco. And so, since October 2025, for everyone born in, or after, 2007 it’s illegal to buy tobacco, including foreigners.

== Prevalence ==
About 32.3% of adult Maldivians reported being current tobacco users in 2020.

== See also ==
- Tobacco Control Act of the Maldives 2010
