= Collin Tukuitonga =

Niuean-born New Zealand public health doctor and academic

Sir Collin Tukuitonga KNZM, FRNZCGP, FNZCPHM
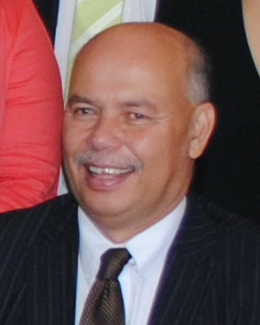
- Tukuitonga in 2011

Academic background
- Education: University of Sydney (MPH) University of the South Pacific (MBBS)

Academic work
- Discipline: Public Health scholar
- Institutions: University of Auckland World Health Organization Ministry of Health (New Zealand)

Sir Collin Fonotau Tukuitonga KNZM (born 1957 or 1958) is a Niuean-born New Zealand doctor, public health academic, public policy expert and advocate for reducing health inequalities of Māori and Pasifika people. He has held several positions in public health and government in New Zealand and internationally.

== Early life and education ==
Tukuitonga was born and raised in Niue. He completed his medical degree in Fiji, followed by a master's degree in public health in Sydney.

=== Name ===
Tukuitonga's first name was spelt 'Colin' for many years but as of 2022 he reverted to its original spelling with a double 'l'.

== Career ==
Tukuitonga was Chief Executive of the Ministry of Pacific Island Affairs, Director of Public Health for the Ministry of Health and also Coordinator of Surveillance of Noncommunicable Diseases for the World Health Organization (WHO) based in Geneva. From 2014 to 2020 he was Director-General of the Secretariat of the Pacific Community. In 2018 he was nominated by the New Zealand government to be the Regional Director of the Western Pacific Region of the World Health Organization however he did not gain the position.

In 2020 Tukuitonga was appointed as inaugural Associate Dean Pacific at the Health and Medical Sciences faculty of the University of Auckland.

In November 2022 he was appointed for a three year term on the Public Health Advisory Committee (PHAC); the PHAC provides public health advice to government and the Minister of Health.

In 2023, Tukuitonga was appointed a Fellow of the International Science Council for his contributions to Pacific health.

In December 2023, Tukuitonga resigned as chairperson of Te Whatu Ora's Pacific Senate, citing his disagreement with the incoming Sixth National Government's scrapping of the Smokefree Environments and Regulated Products (Smoked Tobacco) Amendment Act 2022 and Te Aka Whai Ora (Māori Health Authority). He said that: "I really don't want to work for this government. I have no confidence. They are not going to treat Pacific people well and I want to be free to speak up and speak out." In addition, Tukuitonga stepped down from several other government advisory groups.

in June 2024, Te Ao Māori News reported that Tukuitonga would take up a new role as chairperson of the World Health Organization's Strategic and Technical Advisory Group on the Prevention and Control of Noncommunicable Diseases (STAG-NCD).

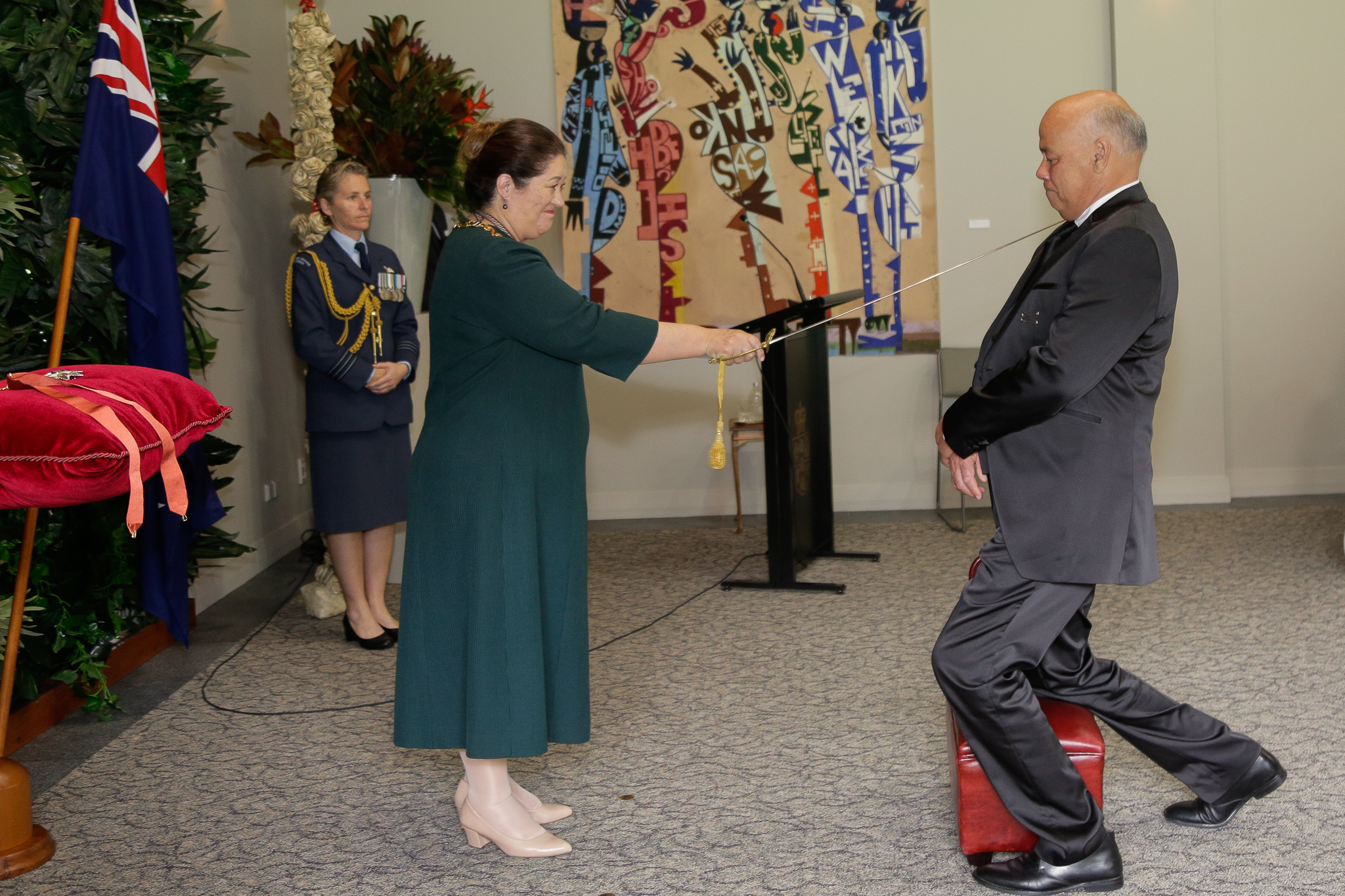
Tukuitonga's investiture as a Knight Companion of the New Zealand Order of Merit by the governor-general, Dame Cindy Kiro, at Government House, Auckland, on 26 August 2022

== Honours and awards ==
Tukuitonga was appointed a Knight Companion of the New Zealand Order of Merit, for services to Pacific and public health, in the 2022 Queen's Birthday and Platinum Jubilee Honours.

== Selected publications ==
- Tukuitonga, Collin F. (1996). "Sudden infant death syndrome in Pacific Islands infants in Auckland". The New Zealand Medical Journal. 109 (1031): 388. PMID 8890883. Wikidata Q71724682.
- Lawes, Carlene M. M.; Tukuitonga, Collin F.; Scragg, Robert Keith Rhodes (1999). "The epidemiology of breast cancer in Pacific women in New Zealand". The New Zealand Medical Journal. 112 (1096): 354–357. PMID 10587053. Wikidata Q73247219.
- Pryor, Jan; Finau, Sitaleki; Tukuitonga, Collin F. (2000). "Pacific Health Research Council: health research by and for Pacificans". Pacific health dialog : a publication of the Pacific Basin Officers Training Program and the Fiji School of Medicine. 7 (2): 115–117. PMID 11588912. Wikidata Q74597344.
- Tukuitonga, Collin F.; Bell, Sharon Margaret; Robinson, Elizabeth (2000). "Hospial admission among Pacific children Auckland 1992-97". The New Zealand Medical Journal. 113 (1116): 358–361. PMID 11130369. Wikidata Q73328251.
- Tukuitonga, Collin F. (2001). "Meningococcal vaccine". The New Zealand Medical Journal. 114 (1145): 557. PMID 11833953. Wikidata Q77611593.
- Finau, Sitaleki; Tukuitonga, Collin F. (2001). "Cancer in Niue: analysis of a cancer register 1962-1985". Pacific health dialog : a publication of the Pacific Basin Officers Training Program and the Fiji School of Medicine. 8 (1): 94–98. PMID 12017844. Wikidata Q43434758.
- Wilson, Nick; Borland, Ron; Edwards, Richard; Tukuitonga, Collin F. (2007). "Tobacco-free countries: could Pacific Island countries lead the way?". The New Zealand Medical Journal. 120 (1266): U2845. PMID 18264212. Wikidata Q80671186.
- Tukuitonga, Collin F. (2011). "A few words on the Pacific Islands Families Study". Pacific health dialog : a publication of the Pacific Basin Officers Training Program and the Fiji School of Medicine. 17 (2): 209. PMID 22675818. Wikidata Q84319697.
- Leao Talalelei Tuitama; Shin Young-Soo; Clark, Helen Elizabeth; Tukuitonga, Collin F.; Beaglehole, Robert H. (2014). "Acting on the Pacific crisis in non-communicable diseases". The Lancet. 384 (9957): 1823–1824. doi:10.1016/s0140-6736(14)61824-9. PMID 25457906. Wikidata Q41628336.
- Tukuitonga, Collin F. (2018). "Interview with Dr Colin Tukuitonga: from crisis to action in Pacific communities". Public health research & practice. 28 (4). doi:10.17061/phrp2841827. PMID 30652187. Wikidata Q91083638.
