= Tobacco industry =

Persons and companies that produce tobacco-related products

The tobacco industry comprises those persons and companies who are engaged in the growth, preparation for sale, shipment, advertisement, and distribution of tobacco and tobacco-related products. It is a global industry; tobacco can grow in any warm, moist environment, which means it can be farmed on all continents except Antarctica.

According to the WHO Framework Convention on Tobacco Control, the "tobacco industry" encompasses tobacco manufacturers, wholesale distributors and importers of tobacco products. This evidence-based treaty expects its 181 ratified member states to implement public health policies with respect to tobacco control "to protect present and future generations from the devastating health, social, environmental and economic consequences of tobacco consumption and exposure to tobacco smoke."

Tobacco, one of the most widely used addictive substances in the world, is a plant native to the Americas and historically one of the most important crops grown by American farmers. More specifically, tobacco refers to any of various plants of the genus Nicotiana (especially N. tabacum) native to tropical America and widely cultivated for their leaves, which are dried and processed chiefly for smoking in pipes, cigarettes, and cigars; it is also cut to form chewing tobacco or ground to make snuff or dipping tobacco, as well as other less common preparations. From 1617 to 1793, tobacco was the most valuable cash crop export from British North America and the United States. Until the 1960s, the United States grew, manufactured and exported more tobacco than any other country.

Tobacco is an agricultural commodity product, similar in economic terms to agricultural foodstuffs: the price is in part determined by crop yields, which vary depending on local weather conditions. The price also varies by specific species or cultivar grown, the total quantity on the market ready for sale, the area where it is grown, the health of the plants, and other characteristics individual to product quality.

Since 1964, conclusive medical evidence of the deadly effects of tobacco consumption has led to a sharp decline in official support for tobacco production. Policy and law restricting tobacco smoking has increased globally, but almost 6 trillion cigarettes are still produced each year. Between 2008 and 2022, the number of cigarettes sold decreased by about 12 %. Tobacco is often heavily taxed to gain revenues for governments and as an incentive for people not to smoke.

== History ==
For a history of how tobacco has been grown and marketed, see tobacco, smoking and articles on similar topics.

Cigarette manufacturing was revolutionized by the 1880 invention of an automated rolling machine by James Bonsack. His machine could produce over 120,000 cigarettes a day, a task that would have previously required the equivalent of a month's labor by a skilled hand-roller, dramatically increasing production capacity while lowering costs.

== Position of industry ==
The phrase "tobacco industry" generally refers to the companies involved in the manufacture of cigarettes, cigars, snuff, chewing tobacco and pipe tobacco. China National Tobacco Co. has become the largest tobacco company in the world by volume. Following extensive merger and acquisition activity in the 1990s and 2000s such as the spinoff of Altria's international tobacco holdings as Philip Morris International in 2008 and R. J. Reynolds Tobacco Company's sale of its international tobacco holdings to Japan Tobacco creating Japan Tobacco International in 1999, five firms dominate international markets – in alphabetical order:

- Altria
- British American Tobacco
- Imperial Tobacco
- Japan Tobacco
- Philip Morris International

In August 2024, Japan Tobacco's JT Group agreed to acquire U.S. cigarette company Vector Group in a cash deal, and Japan Tobacco later said it completed the acquisition on 7 October 2024.

Altria still owns the Philip Morris tobacco business in the United States, but Philip Morris International (PMI) has been fully independent since 2008. In 2022, PMI acquired more than 90% ownership of the Swedish tobacco company Swedish Match, following a $16 billion takeover bid. In most countries these companies either have long-established dominance, or have purchased the major domestic producer or producers (often a former state monopoly). Until 2014 the United States had one other substantial independent firm, Lorillard, which Reynolds American, Inc. acquired. India has its own major player, ITC Limited (25.4%-owned by British American Tobacco). A small number of state monopolies survive, as well as some small independent firms.

Tobacco advertising is becoming increasingly restricted by the governments of countries around the world citing health issues as a reason to restrict tobaccos appeal.

== Industry outlook in the United States ==
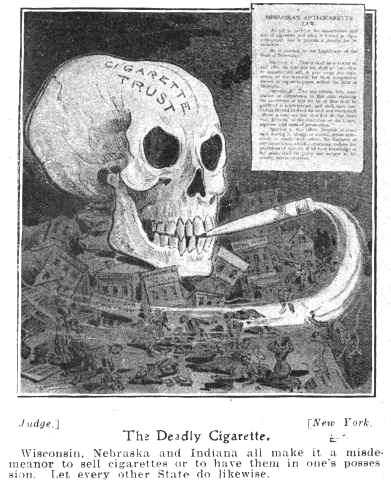
Anti-smoking ad, 1905

The tobacco industry in the United States has suffered greatly since the mid-1990s, when it was successfully sued by several U.S. states. The suits claimed that tobacco causes cancer, that companies in the industry knew this, and that they deliberately understated the significance of their findings, contributing to the illness and death of many citizens in those states.

The industry was found to have decades of internal memos confirming in detail that tobacco (which contains nicotine) is both addictive and carcinogenic (cancer-causing). The industry had long denied that nicotine is addictive.

The suit resulted in a large cash settlement being paid by a group of tobacco companies to the states that sued. Further, since the suit was settled, other individuals have come forth, in class action lawsuits, claiming individual damages.

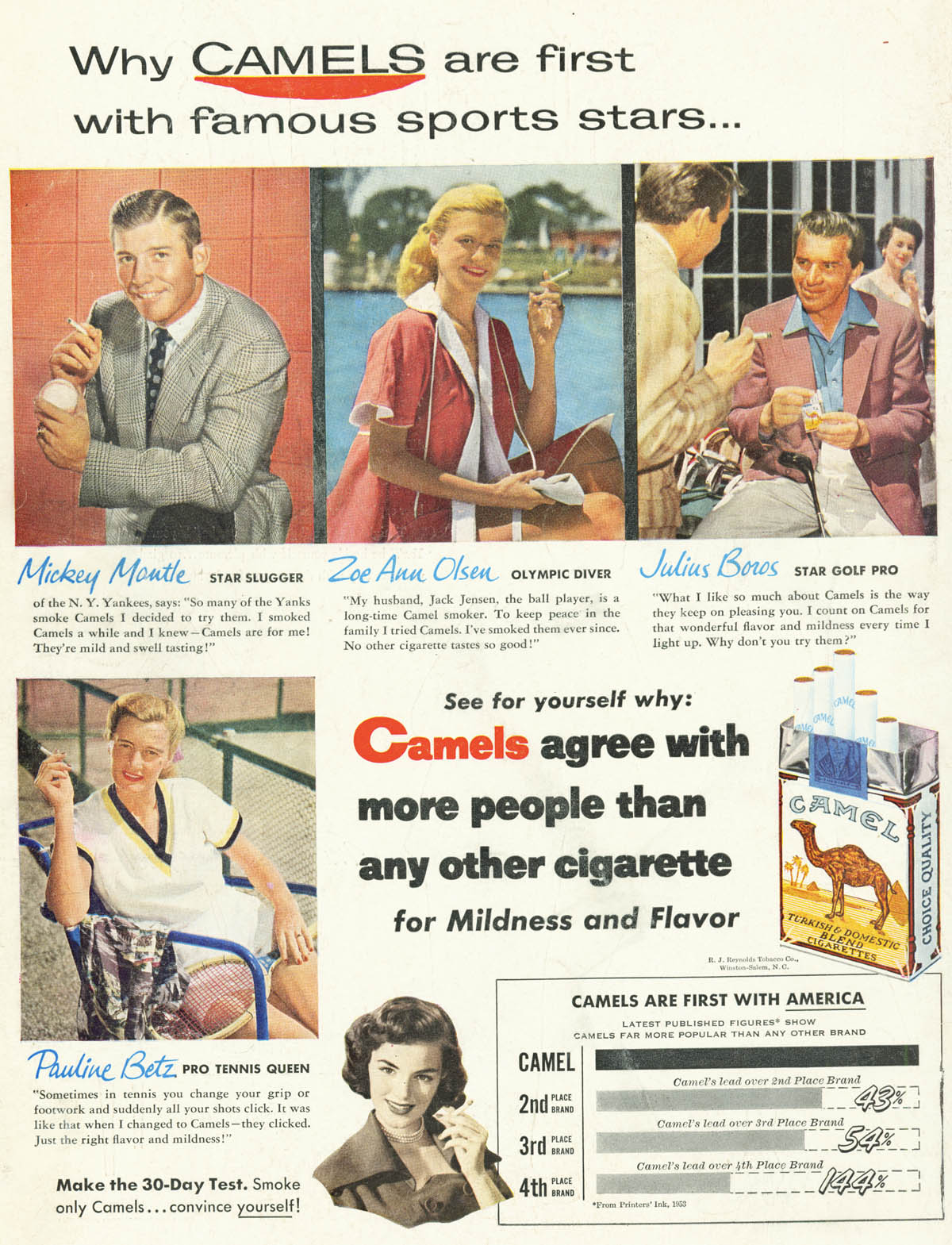
1949 advertisement for Camel cigarettes

The tobacco industry has historically been largely successful in this litigation process, with the majority of cases being won by the industry. During the first 42 years of tobacco litigation (between 1954 and 1996) the industry maintained a clean record in litigation thanks to tactics described in a R.J. Reynolds Tobacco Company internal memo as "the way we won these cases, to paraphrase Gen. Patton, is not by spending all of Reynolds' money, but by making the other son of a bitch spend all of his." Between 1995 and 2005 only 59% of cases were won by the tobacco industry either outright or on appeal in the US, but the continued success of the industry's efforts to win these cases is questionable. In Florida, the industry has lost 77 of the 116 "Engle progeny" cases that have gone to trial. The U.S. Supreme Court has also denied the industry's major grounds for appeal of Engle cases.

In June 2009, U.S. President Barack Obama signed into law the Family Smoking Prevention and Tobacco Control Act which has been called a "sweeping anti-smoking" bill. Among other restrictions, this Act banned the use of any constituent, additive, herb or spice that adds a "characterizing flavor" to the tobacco product or smoke (Section 907)(a)(1)(A). The aim of this ban is to prevent children and teenagers from becoming addicted to cigarettes at a young age with the US Department of Health and Human Services citing that "studies have shown that 17 year old smokers are three times as likely to use flavored cigarettes as are smokers over the age of 25". This ban however does not apply to menthol cigarettes, which are exempt from the bill.

In 2022, the FDA suggested introducing a product standard that would prohibit menthol from being used as a flavouring agent in cigarettes. However, the final rule submitted for federal regulatory review was withdrawn on 21 January 2025.

Lawsuits against the tobacco industry are primarily restricted to the United States due to differences in legal systems in other countries. Many businesses class ongoing lawsuits as a cost of doing business in the US and feel their revenue will be only marginally affected by the activities.

In Canada, a court-approved settlement plan announced in March 2025 would require the Canadian units of Philip Morris, British American Tobacco and Japan Tobacco to pay C$32.5 billion to resolve long-running tobacco lawsuits, following creditor protection proceedings begun in 2019. The settlement took effect on 29 August 2025.

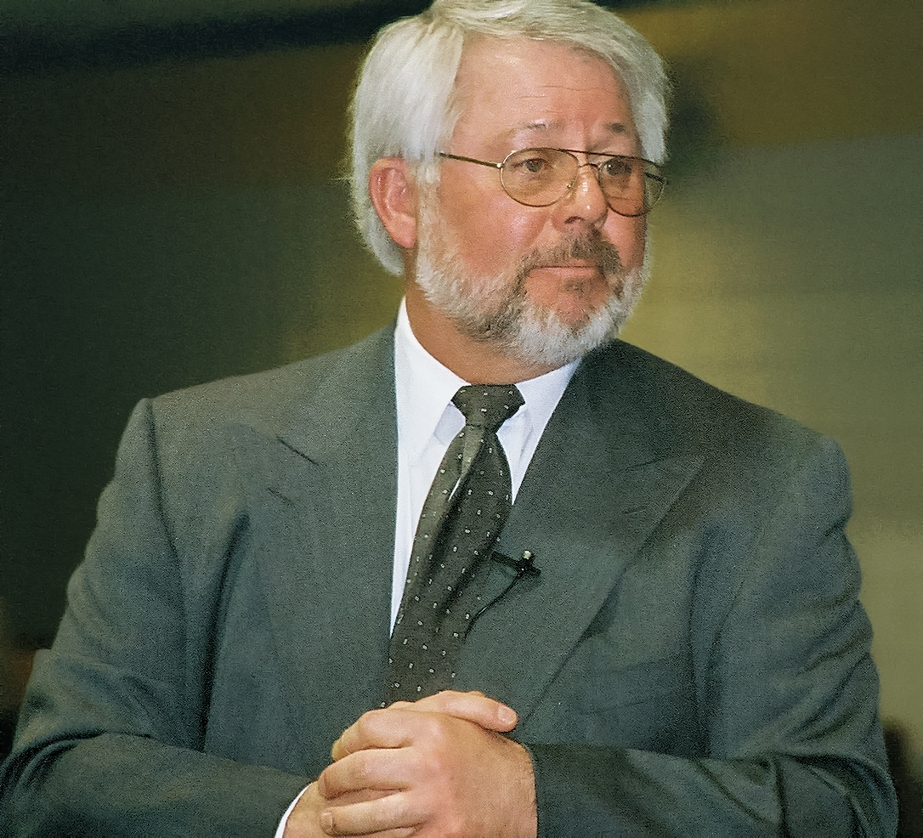
Jeffrey Wigand, the former research chief at America's third-largest tobacco company, exposed safety problems related to the tobacco industry.

Large tobacco companies have entered the electronic cigarette market by either buying some of the small e-cigarette companies or by starting their own e-cigarette companies. By 2014 all the major multinational tobacco companies had entered the e-cigarette market. They did so either by buying existing e-cigarette companies (including Ruyan, the original Chinese e-cigarette company, which was bought by Imperial Tobacco) or by developing their own products. A 2017 review states, "The tobacco industry dominates the e-cigarette market." All of the large tobacco companies are selling e-cigarettes. Major transnational tobacco companies have also expanded into heated-tobacco products and oral nicotine products, including nicotine pouches. A 2017 review states, "Small companies initially dominated the electronic nicotine delivery systems (ENDS) market, and these firms had no links to the tobacco industry. Today, however, all transnational tobacco companies sell these products. Increased concentration of the ENDS market in the hands of the transnational tobacco companies is concerning to the public health community, given the industry's legacy of obfuscating many fundamental truths about their products and misleading the public with false claims, including that low-tar and so-called "light" cigarettes would reduce the harms associated with smoking. Although industry representatives are claiming interest in ENDS because of their harm-reduction potential, many observers believe that profit remains the dominant motivation." However, research into whether vaping among young people leads to subsequent cigarette smoking could not be verified. Although longitudinal studies consistently find an association between vaping and subsequent smoking initiation, the relationship still remains unclear, which is due to limited evidence caused by publication bias, high sample attrition and insufficient adjustment for potential factors that could confound the results. At a population level, it can be observed that cigarette smoking among young people has continued to decline in some countries. For example, in the US, the proportion of middle- and high-school students who are current cigarette smokers reached a record low of 1.4% in 2024, while the proportion of students who are current e-cigarette users was around 5.9%. In the U.S., a consumer class action settlement involving JUUL and Altria was approved by the court and payments were sent to eligible class members around the 18 October 2024. In July 2025, the U.S. Food and Drug Administration (FDA) authorized the marketing of certain tobacco- and menthol-flavoured JUUL e-cigarette products through the premarket tobacco product application pathway. The FDA also proposed a reduction in nicotine to nonaddictive levels in cigarettes and other combusted tobacco products that year.

In the United Kingdom, the Tobacco and Vapes Bill was introduced in the House of Commons on 5 November 2024, including provisions to restrict the future sale of tobacco by birth year and to regulate the advertising and promotion of tobacco and vapes. The Tobacco and Vapes Bill was listed by the UK Parliament as a Government Bill in the 2024–26 session, with its status updated on 15 January 2026. The Bill received its Royal Assent on 29 April 2026. From 1 January 2027, it will be illegal to sell tobacco to anyone born on or after 1 January 2009 in the United Kingdom.

Major tobacco companies are dominating the political and policy-making environments just as they have in conventional cigarette policy making. As they have done to influence tobacco control policies for conventional cigarettes, the large companies often try to stay out of sight and work through third parties that can obscure their links to the tobacco industry. The one difference from the historical pattern of industry efforts to shape tobacco policy from behind the scenes is that there are also genuine independent sellers of e-cigarettes and associated users (so-called vape shops) who are not necessarily being directed by the cigarette companies. These smaller operators are, however, losing market share to the big tobacco companies, and the real political power is now being exercised by the cigarette companies. The cigarette companies try to take advantage of the existence of independent players while acting through the industry's traditional allies and front groups.

== Tobacco control ==
On May 11, 2004, the U.S. became the 108th country to sign the World Health Organization's Global Treaty on Tobacco Control. This treaty places broad restrictions on the sale, advertising, shipment and taxation of tobacco products. The U.S. has not yet ratified this treaty in its Senate and does not yet have a schedule for doing so.

The Protocol to Eliminate Illicit Trade in Tobacco is a treaty that came into force in September 2018. It supplements the WHO Framework Convention on Tobacco Control (FCTC) by addressing topics such as supply chain control, law enforcement, international cooperation, and more. As of 2026, the protocol has 73 parties. WHO Study Group on Tobacco Product Regulation has also addressed cigarette filters, considering their impact on smoking behaviour, health and the environment.

Most recently, there has been discussion within the tobacco control community of transforming the tobacco industry through the replacement of tobacco corporations by other types of business organizations that can be established to provide tobacco to the market while not attempting to increase market demand.

On February 20, 2007, the US Supreme Court ruled that the Altria Group (formerly Philip Morris) did not have to pay $79.5 million in punitive damages awarded to Mayola Williams in a 1999 Oregon court ruling, when she sued Phillip Morris for responsibility in the cancer death of her husband, Jesse Williams. The Supreme Court's decision overturns a ruling made by the Oregon Supreme Court that upheld the award.

On April 3, 2008, the U.S. Court of Appeals for the Second Circuit threw out an $800 billion class-action lawsuit filed on behalf of a group or class of people who smoked light cigarettes. The plaintiffs' lawyers were confident that they would be able to win this suit due to the success of Schwab v. Philip Morris wherein tobacco companies were found guilty of fraud-like charges because they were selling the idea that light cigarettes were safer than regular cigarettes. The ruling by the three-judge panel will not allow the suit to be pursued as a class, but instead need proof for why individual smokers chose light cigarettes over regular cigarettes.

== Production by country or region ==
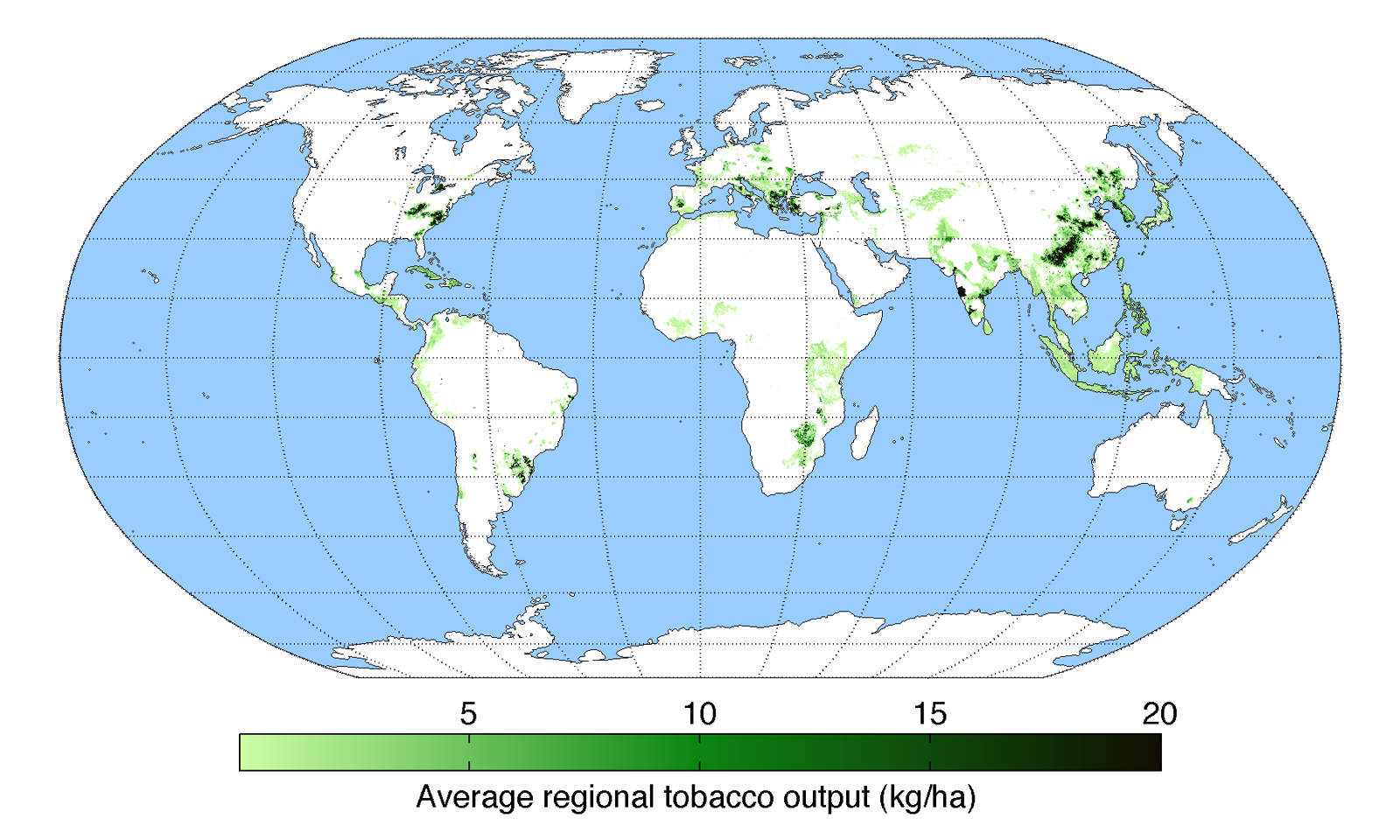
Map of tobacco production across the world

The United Nations Food and Agriculture Organization estimates the following production of unmanufactured tobacco by country/region in 2022. (Figures are in thousands of tonnes.)(FAO)

Country or region	Production in thousands of tons
China	2,188.1
India	772.2
Brazil	667.3
Indonesia	225.6
United States	202.9
Zimbabwe	166.9
Pakistan	133.6
Malawi	103.8
Argentina	95.6
Mozambique	95.5
World	5,780.9

== Cigarette production by factory ==
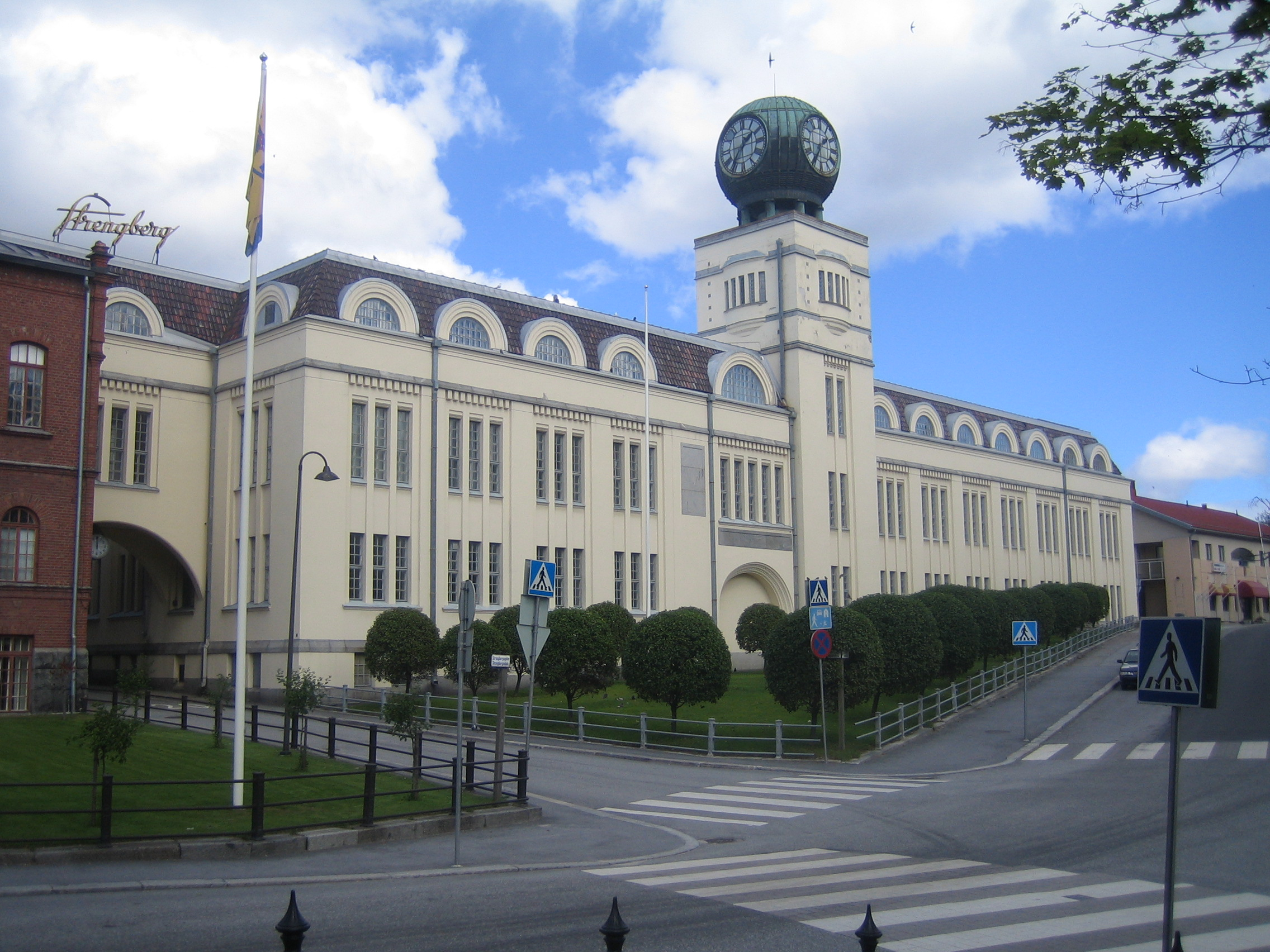
Strengberg's old, now closed tobacco factory in Jakobstad, Finland

Much of global tobacco production is used in the manufacturing of cigarettes. The following is a chart compiled by Dr. Robert Proctor detailing the largest cigarette factories, accompanied by their estimated annual death toll due to the harms of cigarettes to health.

== In popular culture ==
The tobacco industry has had a long relationship with the entertainment industry. In silent era movies, back-lit smoke was often used by filmmakers to create sense of mystery and sensuality in a scene. Later, cigarettes were deliberately placed in the hands of Hollywood stars as an early phase of product placement, until health regulating bodies tightened rules on tobacco advertisement and anti-smoking groups pressured actors and studio executives against such tactics. Big Tobacco has since been the subject focus of films such as the docudrama The Insider (1999) and Thank You For Smoking (2005).

These issues have also constituted a recurring storyline in the AMC series Mad Men, from season 1 beginning with the pilot episode ("Smoke Gets In Your Eyes") through season 7's midseason finale, "Waterloo".

== See also ==
Tobacco industry by country

- Tobacco industry in Argentina
- Tobacco industry in Egypt
- Tobacco industry in Malawi
- Tobacco industry in Pakistan
- Tobacco production in the Philippines
- Tobacco industry in Switzerland

Other

- List of tobacco-related topics
- Tobacco in the United States
- Health effects of tobacco
- History of commercial tobacco in the United States
- Nicotine marketing
- Smoking bans
- Snus
- Tobacco politics
