= Melbourne tobacco wars =

Organised crime turf wars in Victoria, Australia

- Part of Organised crime in Australia
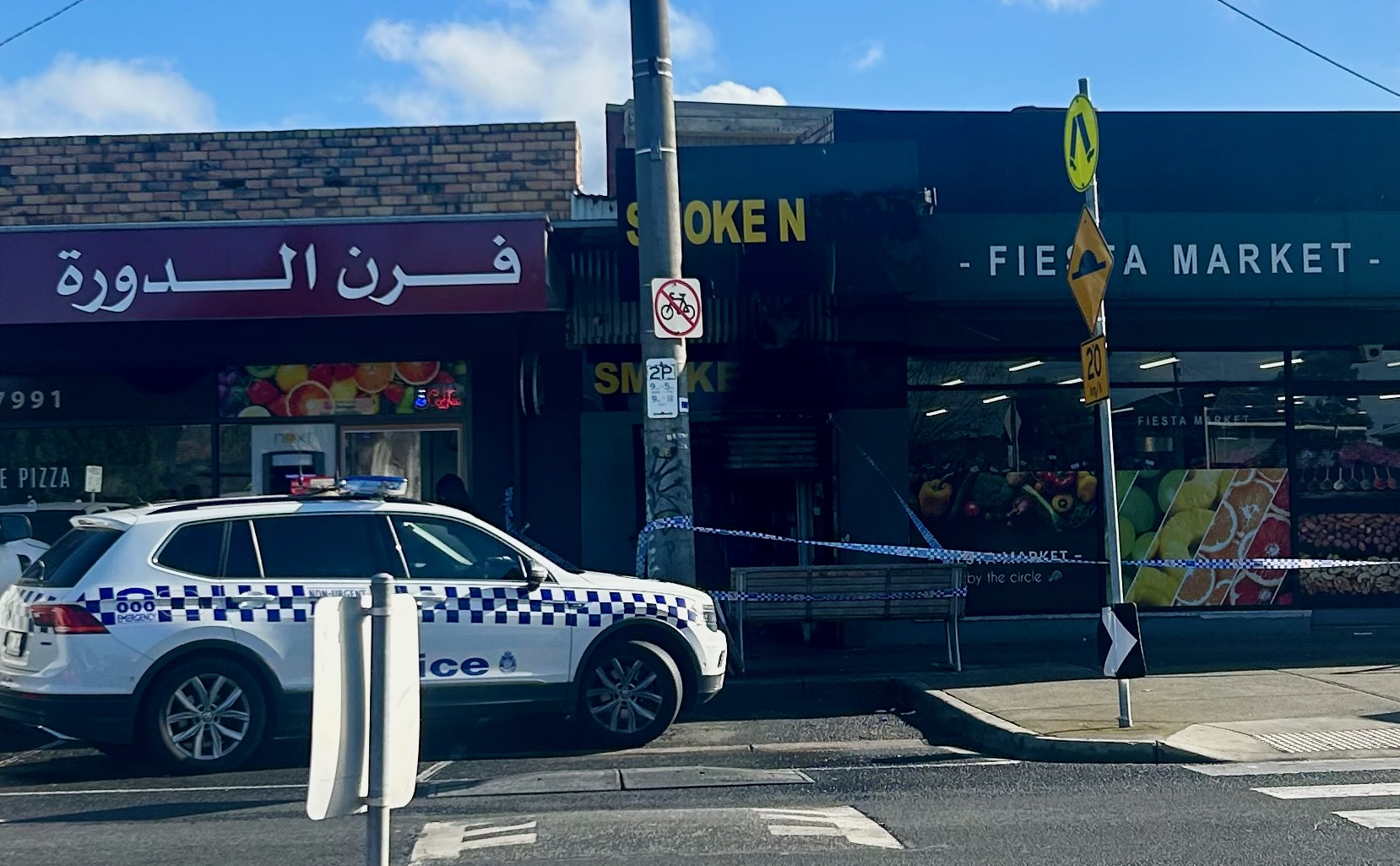
- A tobacconist after an arson attack in Altona North
- Date: 24 March 2023 – ongoing
- Location: Victoria, Australia
- Methods: Arson; Extortion; Shooting; Firebombing; Ram-raiding
- Status: Ongoing

Casualties
- Deaths: 1 (mistaken identity)
- Arrested: Over 100 (as of January 2025)
- Buildings destroyed: Over 100

The Melbourne tobacco wars are an ongoing series of violent criminal incidents centered on turf wars between organised crime groups over control of the illegal tobacco trade in Melbourne, Victoria, Australia. The conflict has been marked by firebombings, extortion, and shootings. As of early 2025, Victoria Police report over 125 arson attacks and more than 100 arrests.

== Background ==
The illegal tobacco trade in Australia is highly lucrative due to high taxation on legal tobacco. Organised crime groups have increasingly turned to this trade, leading to violent competition over territory and market control.

A 2023 investigation by The Age reported that some gangs were importing illegal cigarettes via container ports or manufacturing them locally. Illicit tobacco is sold through otherwise legitimate-looking stores, often owned or operated by front companies. A packet of cigarettes costing up to $50 AUD in taxes when sold legally might be sold for as little as $15 AUD under the counter.

The retail turf war intensified after new Commonwealth laws increased penalties and enforcement powers related to illicit tobacco in mid-2023.

== Conflict ==
Criminal syndicates have been targeting rival tobacco shops and convenience stores suspected of selling illicit tobacco. The attacks include petrol bombings, arson, and extortion attempts. Taskforce Lunar, established by Victoria Police, is investigating the conflict. Many of these criminal syndicates operate offshore, with several operations based in the Middle East.

Certain experts have linked the illicit tobacco trade to financing for terrorist groups. Illegal tobacco criminal underworld boss Kazem Hamad, who was deported to Iraq in 2023, has been implicated in being involved in attacks in Melbourne targeting Jewish businesses, in addition to over 150 attacks targeting tobacco shops across Melbourne. One such firebombing was connected to the 2024 Adass Israel Synagogue attack.

According to Taskforce Lunar, investment and interest in the illicit tobacco trade by organized crime syndicates began over a decade ago, in 2015. In 2018, a federal Illicit Tobacco Taskforce (ITTF) was created to thwart the activity and the increasing infiltration of organised crime syndicates into the illicit tobacco market. In early 2023, organized crime syndicates formed a commission to regulate the prices of illegal cigarettes. This deal excluded crime boss Kazem Hamad, who kicked off a series of retribution attacks.

Over 100 people have been arrested in connection with the conflict as of January 2025.

Since April 2026, almost 20 firebombings of Melbourne restaurants and bars have been connected to the tobacco wars which has recently been named "The Bar Wars". Authorities have warned that this is a new evolution of the gang war as criminal gangs move away from tobacco and into the realm of illicit alcohol sales.

Victorian police have warned about the escalating state of the conflict, as law enforcement warns it may be falling behind organised crime syndicates using encrypted telecommunications technology and cryptocurrency to avoid surveillance and detection from the federal government of their criminal activities. Sources from the underworld have said that criminal syndicates have commissioned the creation of an app that will allow customers of illicit cigarettes to order the product through the platform and have it delivered directly to their homes or businesses.

Tobacco retailers can receive a threatening note, either left on the front of their business or delivered in person, warning them to the call "The Commission" on a encrypted WhatsApp number otherwise face being "burnt down".

In July 2026, The Age newspaper reported that there were 200 tobacco retailers in 2017 and in 2026 now there are 1400.

In the same month, police charged a 20-year-old Essendon man for allegedly organising attacks on hospitality venues. The man is reportedly a senior member of "The Commission".

== Casualties and damages ==
Aftermath of arson attack on tobacco shop in Sunshine

Victoria Police have confirmed over 100 properties have been firebombed, primarily tobacco retailers and convenience stores across Melbourne and regional Victoria.

In Coburg, a fire destroyed part of a convenience store and caused collateral damage to an adjacent nightclub, including $15,000 worth of DJ equipment.

In Fawkner, an arson attack on a smoke shop resulted in heavy damage to neighboring businesses, including a family-owned cake shop.

In January 2025, a residence was firebombed in Melbourne, which ended up being a case of mistaken identity. A 27-year-old woman named Katie Tangey was killed in the house fire in Truganina.

In July 2026, a tobacco shop in Victoria Street in Richmond was ram raided and set alight, destroying the shop and damaging ten neighbouring shops.

== See also ==
- Chop-chop (tobacco)
- Tobacco in Australia
- Melbourne gangland killings
