= Smoking in Australia =

Smoking in Australia is restricted by both federal and state and territory law which bans smoking in enclosed public places, workplaces, in areas of public transport including airports and in some situations where children are present.

Tobacco smoking has been the most common form of smoking in Australia, but the proportion of the population who smoke daily has declined significantly to single digit rates as of 2023. Data collected by the Cancer Council of Victoria and the Australian Institute of Health and Welfare's National Drug Strategy Household Surveys in 2015 showed the most common form of tobacco smoked in Australia was factory made cigarettes. A study conducted by the International Tobacco Control (ITC) in 2006 showed "roll your own tobacco" was being utilised by 24% of smokers, who were more likely to be male and have lower levels of income and education than other smokers.

Unbranded loose tobacco, sometimes known as chop-chop in Australia, sold illegally without government taxation, was used by 9% of smokers in 2023 according to the National Drug Strategy Household Survey in that year. The high level of tobacco taxation, intended to reduce smoking rates, has made 'chop-chop' more attractive as a cheaper option and therefore utilised as an alternative to factory made cigarettes. Unlike other forms of smoking, the use of e-cigarettes or vapes has been increasing in Australia, with the proportion of the population who used a vape daily rising from 0.5% in 2016 to 3.5% in 2023, with 7% of the population considering themselves a current user.

Cannabis is another drug which can be smoked, including rolled in a cigarette. Cannabis in Australia is legal for use in some doctor-prescribed medicines, including via smoking. Recreational use of cannabis is illegal except in the Australian Capital Territory where it has been decriminalised. In 2023, 11.5% of the population had used cannabis recreationally within the last 12 months.

== History ==
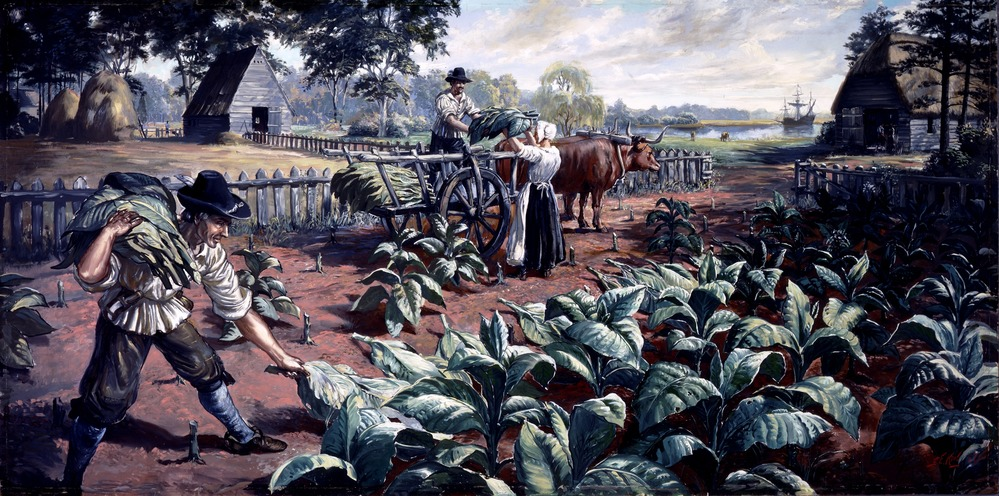
Tobacco farming

In the early 1700s, tobacco smoking was introduced to the north dwelling indigenous communities through the visitation of the Indonesian fishermen. However, the British customs and behaviour of the utilisation of tobacco was introduced into the Australian culture in 1788, due to the colonisation of Australia by the Europeans, and evidently, these tobacco related behaviours rapidly spread throughout the Aboriginal community, the free settlers and the convicts from Britain. When first introduced within Australia, the supply of tobacco was restricted within the Australian community, however by the 1800s tobacco was a fundamental item being used as a reward for a servants labour, or antagonistically used as a punishment for convicts, due to its addictive side effects. Eventually, by 1819, 80 to 90 percent of the labour force were smokers.

By the 1880s the production of cigarettes were completely mechanised, however was often chosen over dandies and larrikins. More importantly, the cheapness and ease of accessibility of these manufactured cigarettes, revolutionised the way Australians smoke tobacco. This cigarette was prevalent in the World War 1, as 60% of the tobacco rations donated to the trenches, were in the cigarette form. Cigarette use also rapidly increased up to 70% during World War 1, in contrast to the usage before the war.

In the 1920s, societal views began to transition of women partaking in smoking behaviours and thus over the next several decades companies began to advertise smoking to women. The introduction of women in the workforce, led to greater freedom of women, and hence smoking rates within Australia increased.

By the 1930s the Australian Government began assisting the tobacco industry by introducing the Local Leaf Content Scheme, which required local tobacco to be used up in the manufacturing of cigarettes in Australia. However, in the 1990s the Industry Commission Inquiry found that tobacco had the greatest subsidisation in agriculture within Australia, and thus the Local Leaf Content Scheme was abolished. As a result, the tobacco industry within Australia declined to the oncoming threat of international competition. Currently, no commercial farming of tobacco occurs within Australia, and all tobacco products are imported from overseas.

== Smoking patterns in Australia ==
=== Decline in smoking ===
Daily tobacco smoking in Australia has been declining since 1991, where the smoking population was 24.3%. Correspondingly, in 1995 23.8% of adults smoked daily. This figure also decreased in 2001, where 22.4% of the population used to smoke. This constant trend of the reduction of daily smoking has continued within these past 2 decades, with 16.1% of adults smoking in 2011–12, and finally 14.5% of the population smoking daily in 2014–15, which constitutes 2.6 million adults within Australia. However, most recently it was found that the smoking population of Australia in 2016 was 12.2%, and thus, the smoking population in Australia has almost halved since 1991.

Conversely, the rate of decline for smoking has become steady among recent years, with some sources arguing that the smoking percentage within Australia did not decline between the years of 2013 and 2016.

Decline of smoking in Australia from 1991 to 2016

=== Smoking prevalence in all states and territories ===
The daily smoking percentage in Northern Territory, has typically had the highest smoking rates within Australia. The high smoking rates within Northern Territory resonates with the high percentage of Indigenous individuals living there, as the smoking prevalence of the Indigenous in 2014–15 was 39%. Further, 26% of the Northern Territory population consists of individuals with Aboriginal and Torres Strait Islander heritage, which is 5% less in all the other states and territories within Australia. However, since 1995 Northern Territory has had the largest decrease in daily smoking rates in comparison to all other states, from 35.6% to 21% in 2014–15.

Daily smoking percentages of individuals 18+ in 2014–15, for each state and territory within Australia
	Percentages for daily smoking (%)
New South Wales	14
Victoria	14
Queensland	16
South Australia	13
Western Australia	14
Tasmania	18
Northern Territory	21
Australian Capital Territory	12

=== Smoking rates between males and females ===
The smoking percentage of men in 2016 is 16%, while the smoking percentage of women is 12%. Men have consistently shown to have a higher tendency to smoke daily than women. However, daily smoking percentage for both males and females were 27.3% and 20.3% respectively in 1995, expounding a significant reduction in smoking prevalence for both genders.

In 2017–18, men aged 18–24 years, around 17.5% of that age bracket smoked daily. This percentage remained constant for all age groups until the age of 55–64, were the daily smoking percentage dropped to 16.5%. This figure for daily smoking, further decreased for men at the age of 75+, dropping to a percentage of 5.1%.

Conversely, in 2017–18 it was found that women between the ages of 18 and 24, had a daily smoking percentage of 17.5%. This figure increased to 14.7% of women between the ages of 45 and 54, and eventually decreasing to 7.5% for women between the ages of 65 and 74. Finally, this percentage further dropped to 3.7%, to women 75+.

== Deaths and health related risk factors caused by smoking in Australia ==
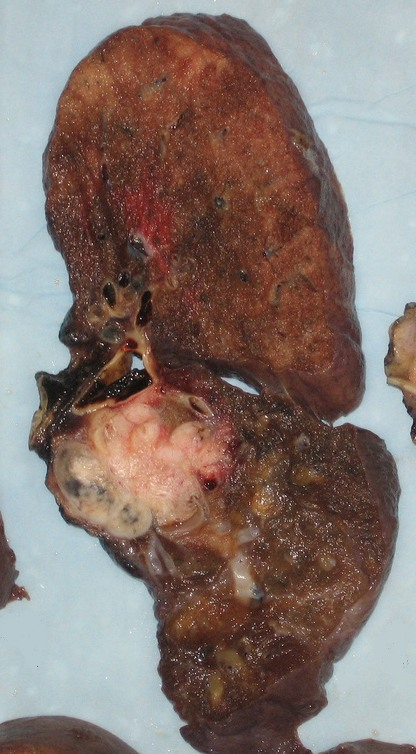
The appearance of lungs after the effects of lung cancer

Smoking is the direct cause of the greatest number of preventable deaths in Australia, with a death toll of 15,500 every year. Smoking has a causative association with a myriad of other types of diseases, such as heart disease, diabetes, stroke and different forms of cancers. In particular, cancers were found to be the leading cause of tobacco-related deaths. Of all deaths caused by smoking in Australia,Lung cancer is the most common cause. In 2003, tobacco was found to be responsible for 7.8% of disease and injury that occurred within Australia.

Diseases directly attributable by tobacco within Australia in 2011
Disease	Percentage of total burden attributable to tobacco
Lung cancer	30.6
COPD	29.7
Coronary heart disease	12.4
Stroke	3.9
Oesophageal cancer	3.2
Asthma	2.6
Pancreatic cancer	2.6
Mouth and pharyngeal cancer	2
Bowel cancer	1.8
Other cardiovascular disease	1.6
Liver cancer	1.5
Bladder cancer	1.4
Diabetes	0.9
Atrial fibrillation and flutter	0.9
Leukaemia	0.8
Stomach cancer	0.8
Kidney cancer	0.8
Interstitial lung disease	0.7
Other respiratory disease	0.7
Aortic aneurysm	0.5
Peripheral vascular disease	0.2
Hypertensive heart disease	0.2
Cervical cancer	0.2
Lower respiratory infections	0.1
Tuberculosis	0.0
Influenza	0.0
Otitis media	0.0

== Underage smoking ==
=== Smoking prevalence of underage adults ===
The smoking prevalence of underage adults in Australia has oscillated over time. During the 1980s, smoking rates among young adults began to decrease, but increased during the early 1990s, while finally in the 1996, this percentage began to decrease again. Most recently, in 2017, the underage smoking population in Australia was found to be the lowest ever recorded.

The downward trend of the reduction of smoking amongst underage individuals from the late 1990s, was accompanied with the introduction of the National Tobacco Campaign. Although failing to reduce the smoking prevalence amongst adults within Australia, the campaign proved to be a success in reducing smoke rates amongst young adults. Factors such as tobacco taxes and stricter laws to restrict tobacco sales to minors, also played a huge role in decreasing the smoking prevalence amongst the youth. Likewise, the decline in smoking rates from 2011 to 2014 came in light of the establishment of the National Tobacco Strategy in 2012, and a myriad of other factors such as the new plain packaging laws, and introducing more smoke free environments. The slow decline of smoking rates among underage individuals, in recent years can be from a result of less government funded media campaigns and the introduction of new tobacco products within Australia, that entice young adults to smoke.

Smoking percentage of young adults between 16 and 17 that smoked in the past week
Smoking percentage of young adults between 12 and 15 that smoked in the past week

=== Accessibility of cigarettes to young adults ===
In 1996, it was found that 35% of males and 40% of females aged 12–17, most commonly obtained cigarettes through their friends. This way of young adults accessing cigarettes remained as the main source of cigarette accessibility for males, whilst decreasing with age for females. Nonetheless, for male and female young adults between the ages of 16 and 17, the primary source of cigarette accessibility was through illegal purchases in stores, as 45% of females and 55% of males in this age category reported to have purchased their own cigarettes. The second most frequent way that young adults between the ages of 12 and 15 acquired cigarettes was from older individuals who obtained the cigarettes for them. Underage Australian students who participated in smoking purchased cigarettes most commonly from outlets such as retail markets and service stations. It was found that 29% of smokers aged 12 obtained cigarettes from vending machines, in comparison to 5% of older teenagers who obtained cigarettes in this manner. The purchase of single cigarettes was also a common way that underage smokers obtained cigarettes, with 21% of males and 12% of females purchasing single cigarettes regardless of the illegality of individual sale. Rates of purchase of individual cigarettes decreases as the purchaser's age increases, with 29% of 12 year old smokers reporting purchase of single cigarettes in comparison to 5% of individuals between 16 and 17 years of age purchasing single cigarettes.

Underage tobacco use among students in 2018
	Percentage of high school students (%)
Electronic cigarettes	20.8
Cigarettes	8.1
Cigar	7.6
Smokeless tobacco	5.9
Hookahs	4.1
Pipe tobacco	1.1

=== Underage smoking laws ===
==== Western Australia ====
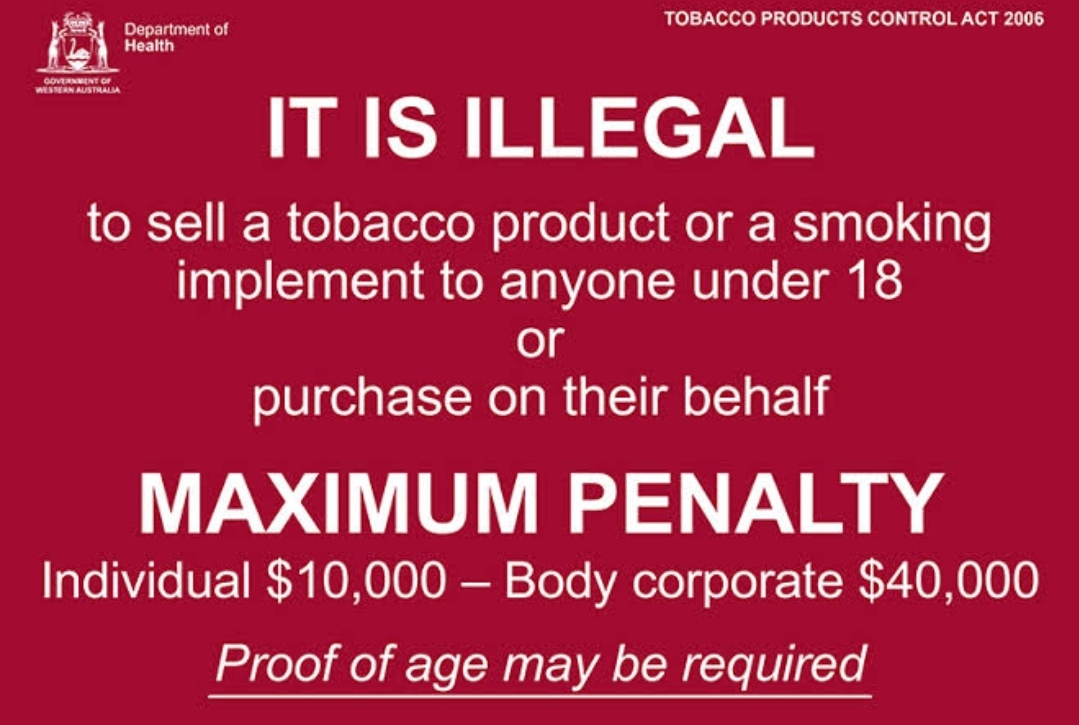
Sign displaying warning about Western Australia's underage smoking laws

The Tobacco Products Control Act (2006), prohibits the sale and supply of cigarettes to minors. The power to monitor and enforce this act lies with the Health Department of Western Australia. This department aims to reduce children's access to tobacco by investigating possible breaches of this act and increasing community aid to educate minors.

==== New South Wales ====
New South Wales has adopted a comprehensive program following the amendments to the Public Health Act 1991, in 1996, due to the rising rate of underage smoking, and their ease in accessing tobacco products. This program ensured that tobacco retailers asked for identification to ensure that customers were above the age of 18, and finally an educational strategy to increase general awareness about the requirements legislated under the Public Health Act 1991. The responsibility of monitoring the compliance of the Public Health Act 1991, falls with the Environmental Health Officers, who prosecute retailers when this legislation is breached.

==== South Australia ====
The measures implemented by South Australia to prevent and minimise the supply of tobacco to underage individuals are enacted through the Tobacco and E-Cigarette Products Act 1977 (the Tobacco Product Regulation Act 1997 prior to 31 March 2019), which ultimately increased penalties for breaches of legislation.

==== Victoria ====
Underage access to tobacco in Victoria is handled through a combination of domestic laws and local projects. The Tobacco Act 1987, makes it illegal for tobacco retailers in Victoria to sell tobacco products to individuals under the age of 18. Educational programs run by QUIT Victoria, assists in informing retailers and making them aware about legislative issues. The amendments to the Tobacco Act 1987, that have been passed recently has also increased the fines for violation of tobacco laws.

Unlike other states there is no current statewide compliance program. However, a high number of councils within Victoria undertake their own compliance testing as the Department of Health and Human Services provides a password protected, educational and enforcement resources online, to assist them in understanding the obligations set by The Tobacco Act 1987, and therefore enforcing and ensuring retailers are compliant.

==== Tasmania ====
The smoking age in Tasmania was raised up to 18 years of age in February 1997, to tackle the increasing rates of underage smoking within the state. The provisions that separated tobacco from confectionery in Tasmania were introduced through the enactment of the Public Health Act 1977. This legislation also allows the government to prosecute retailers or seize tobacco products from underage individuals who are found to be smoking. However, Tasmanian laws doesn't require the identification of age as the only justification to sell tobacco to individuals under the age of 18, as is the circumstance in some states.

==== Northern Territory ====
Between the period of 1996 and 1997, compliance surveys of retailers were conducted throughout Northern Territory, which concluded that 22% of tobacco retailers were fine with selling tobacco products to customers of the age of 15. Due to these results, from 1996 to 1999, educational campaigns were introduced to educate retailers of their responsibilities and ensure that they comply with the Tobacco Act.

The Tobacco Control Act 2002 outlaws the supply of tobacco products to individuals under the age of 18. This act was amended in 2019, coming into effect on 1 July 2019, which legislated that tobacco vending machines will not be allowed to be placed in a liquor licensed area, were an individual under the age of 18 can enter and easily access it.

Future plans to stop underage smoking in Northern Territory, includes The Tobacco Action Plan 2019–2023, which aims to acknowledge the standards under the National Partnership Agreement on Preventive Health (NPAPH) and ultimately control tobacco supply to children under the age of 18, by implementing distinctive activities to improve underage smoking rates in Northern Territory.

==== Queensland ====
Due to the increasing underage smoking rates in Queensland, the Queensland Tobacco Products (Prevention of Supply to Children) Act 1998 was introduced, raising the legal age of purchasing tobacco from 16 to 18 years old of age. The Queensland government also provides training to employees who work at tobacco retailers to ensure that underage individuals can't purchase tobacco from there.

==== Summary ====
Measures implemented by states and territories to restrict underage smoking
	Western Australia	New South Wales	South Australia	Victoria	Tasmania	Northern Territory	Queensland
Legislation preventing sales to minors	Yes	Yes	Yes	Yes	Yes	Yes	Yes
Legislation preventing supply to minors	Yes	No	Yes	Yes	Yes	Yes	Yes
Legislation regulating the possession of tobacco by a minor	No	No	No	Yes	No	No	No
Defence about proof of age	No	Yes	No	Yes	Yes	Yes	Yes
Monitoring the compliance of measures	Yes	Yes	Yes	Yes	Yes	Yes	No
Legal proceedings	57	121	2	11	1	2	1
Selling	50	121	2	11	1	1	1
Supplying	7	—N/a	—N/a	—N/a	1	—N/a	—N/a

== Tobacco-controlling campaigns ==
=== The National Campaign against drug abuse ===
In 1995, the Ministerial Council on Drug Strategy (MCDS) was created, consisting of a myriad of political leaders and ministers all around Australia. The MCDS introduced the National Campaign Against Drug Abuse, later renamed as the National Drug Strategy.

In 1990, the National Campaign Against Drug Abuse, launched a $2 million advertisement, 'Smoking - who needs it?', which was aimed at young girls. This advertisement followed an increase in the percentage of young women adults wanting to reduce their daily smoking rates.

=== The National Tobacco Campaign ===
In 1997, a nationwide campaign was introduced, involving all the Quit campaigns in all states and territories, and the Commonwealth of Australia.

During the initial phase of The National Tobacco Campaign $4.5 million was allocated to the campaign for advertising, while the Quit campaigns around Australia contributed $3.29 million. It was concluded that during this period the National Tobacco Campaign decreased the smoking prevalence within Australia by 1.4%, with an estimated reduction by 10,000 in lung cancer diagnoses, and an estimated reduction in the number of smoking-related strokes by 2,500. It was also found that this campaign allowed 55,000 deaths to be avoided.

The advertising conducted by this campaign essentially focused on smokers between the ages of 18 and 40, and was considered highly successful due to co-operation between state governments, federal governments, and focus groups. The advertisements recognised that smokers could be encouraged to give up smoking by accentuating that in ceasing tobacco use, ex-smokers gain more from the act than they sacrifice.

The campaign introduced 6 media campaigns (entitled 'Artery', 'Lung', 'Tumour', 'Brain', 'Eye' and 'Tar') between the years of 1997 and 2000, intending to appeal to people of lower socioeconomic status by illustrating that individuals in this cross section of society had the highest smoking rates and suffered the highest levels of smoking related disease.

=== Cigarette packaging ===
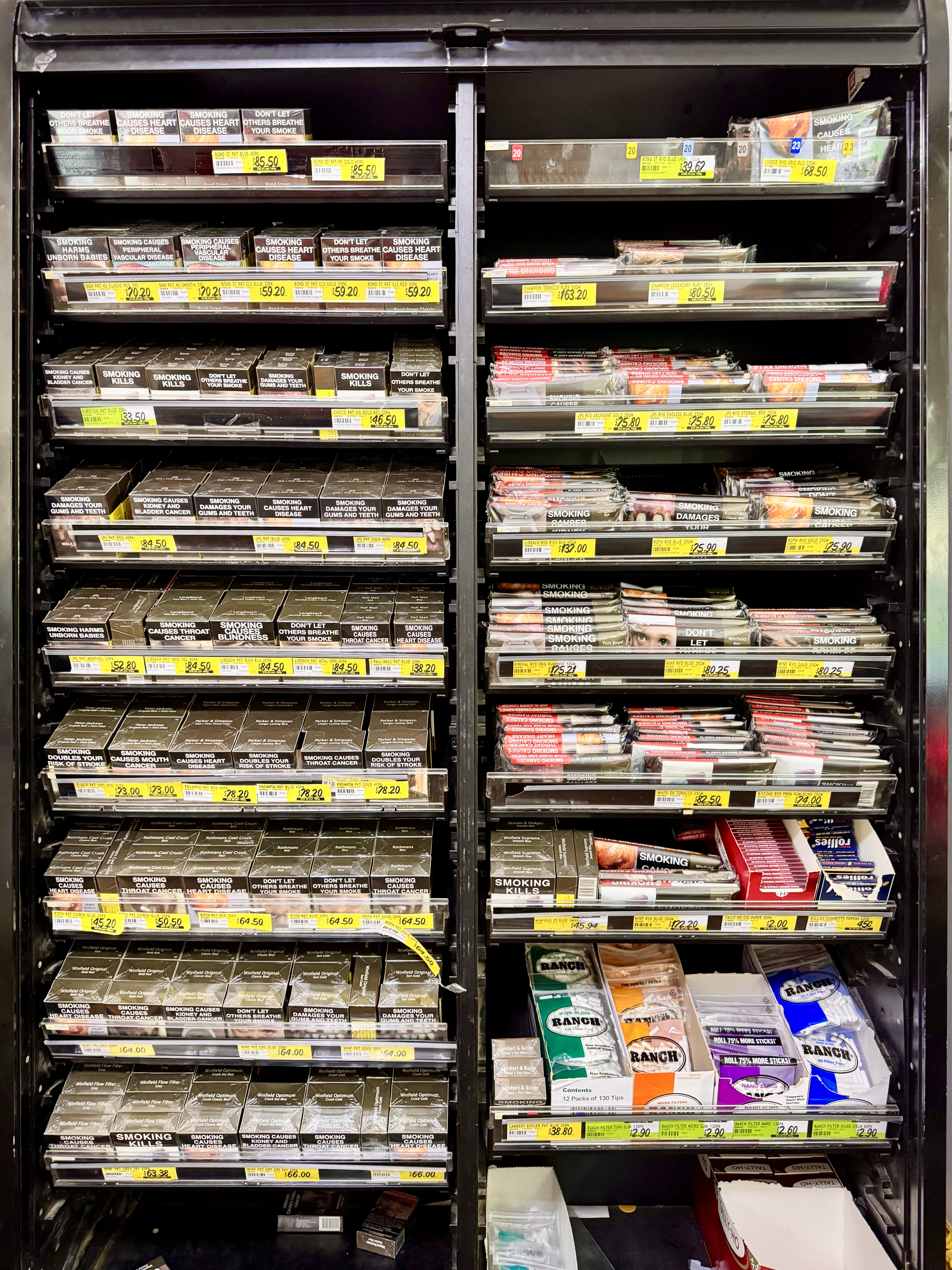
Cigarettes in plain packaging on display

During 2006 new regulations for packaging of tobacco products were introduced, consisting of graphical warnings about the consequences of smoking. Since March 2006, items containing tobacco which were imported for sale or manufactured within Australia need to display the confronting images, warning individuals about the dangers of smoking.

Similarly, legislation requiring plain packaging was enacted through the Tobacco Plain Packaging Act 2011 and the Tobacco Plain Packaging Regulations 2011, which stipulate the use of a particular colour (Pantone 448C), typeface and font sizes, presence and specification of an image depicting disease, and material type and package construction for tobacco products.

Australia's packaging specifications for tobacco and tobacco-relate products are outlined under the Competition and Consumer (Tobacco) Information Standard (2011), which requires that graphical images about the negative effects of smoking on the body must cover 75% of the front and 90% of the back of a cigarette packet. The standard also states that these images must also cover 75% of the back of non-tobacco smoking products.

The intention of implementing plain packaging and requiring the use of an unappealing packet colour, and preventing the use of graphical and stylistic elements to differentiate between brands is to reduce the appeal of tobacco products, and to eliminate packaging as a form of promotion or advertising for the product.

Plain packaging also prevents the use of misleading terms, and reduces subsequent erroneous beliefs held by smokers.

== Illicit tobacco ==
=== Mid-2020s consumption increase ===
The illicit tobacco market has been a major component of the overall tobacco market in Australia, with an industry report estimating that 28.6% of tobacco consumed in Australia in 2023 was illicit, higher than in any other year beginning in 2009, however the accuracy of industry estimates has been questioned by some scholars. Some experts believe the increase in illicit tobacco use in Australia is directly due to tobacco excise tax increases, while others believe the exact relationship between tax increases and illicit tobacco use is uncertain.

According to tobacco industry estimates, in 2023, the most common international brand of manufactured illicit tobacco in Australia was Manchester, accounting for 4.6% of total manufactured cigarette consumption including legal tobacco, followed by Double Happiness with 3.3% of total consumption. This was in contrast to the previous year, in which Double Happiness accounted for 4.7% of consumption and Manchester accounted for 1.9% of consumption.

The increase in the size of the Australian illicit tobacco trade led to violent disputes between rivalling criminal gangs involved in the trade, with the Melbourne tobacco wars in particular gaining notoriety. The Australian Broadcasting Corporation (ABC) reported as part of its Four Corners program that arson incidents in Victoria related to illicit tobacco occurred on average twice weekly in 2024. In October 2023, Victoria Police established Taskforce Lunar as part of enforcement regarding arson and other crimes linked to the illicit tobacco trade. By mid-2024, the taskforce had made 68 arrests and seized cash and illicit tobacco worth over three million Australian dollars in total, according to the police annual report. In South Australia, the ABC reported that nineteen firebombings occurred in Adelaide between early July and early November 2024.

In the leadup to the 2025 Australian federal election, the Australian Association of Convenience Stores authorised a political campaign titled Act on Illicit that sought to represent the interests of legal tobacco traders regarding violent crime related to illicit tobacco consumption. In the 2024-25 financial year, the Australian Border Force reported intercepting more than 2,000 tonnes of illicit tobacco products during their importation into Australia. As of 2026 Victoria is attempting to pass new laws that grant landlords and Tobacco Licensing Victoria the ability to forcefully close stores that sell illicit tobacco products.

== See also ==
- List of smoking bans in Australia
