= Tobacco products in Indonesia =

Tobacco Industry is a road map of the regulations relating to all tobacco products in Indonesia. Tobacco Industry (TI) contains guidelines and industry classification and the products produced by the tobacco industry in Indonesia, including regulations, policies ribbon and excise, tobacco industry strategies, so on and so forth. Tobacco Industry was coined by the Directorate General of Agro and Chemical Industry Department in 2009. Tobacco Industry has a significant role for state revenue through taxes and excise, employments, and protection against multiple impacts of tobacco farmers and others. The development of the TI also consider public health in addition to concern on, so that the industry can grow well. TP is a labor-intensive industry, so to the present of TI and its association with upstream form the procurement of raw materials, particularly tobacco, cloves, and other industries are potential labor-absorbing industrial.

== Classification ==
Tobacco Industry also classify into three groups, namely :

Upstream Industry Group

In Indonesia Standard Industrial Classification (ISIC) 2005, Tobacco Industry classified in Upstream Industry Group is Drying and Processing Tobacco Industry (ISIC 16001). This groups include the field operations fogging and cutting-process-leaves tobacco.

Between Industry Group

Tobacco Industry belonging to Reuters that Condiment Industry Cigarettes and other equipment (ISIC 16009), includes: cigarette flavoring and the other cigarette completeness such as klembak incense, cigarette sauce, uwur, klobot, kawung and manufacture of filters.

Downstream Industry Group

Tobacco Industry that included in the Downstream Industry Group, such as: Cigarettes Industry (ISIC 16002), White Cigarette Industry (ISIC 16003) and other Cigarette Industry (ISIC 1600) includes cigars, cigarettes, incense and cigarettes klembak klobot/kawung.

== Strategy and policy ==
Tobacco is one industry that contributes significantly to the revenues and also provide ample work opportunities for the community. On the other hand, the result of the tobacco industry also have negative effects for public health aspects. Therefore, any policies against tobacco industry ought to consider some aspects that are opposite to each other. In this case, the government has established the Tobacco Industry Road map drawn up jointly between the stakeholders concerned. The outline policy goals tobacco excise rates in 2013 also has to consider the elements contained in the Road map that referred to.

In this context, details of a period of time to achieve those objectives have been outlined in the planning sequence as follows:

- 2006–2010: the order of priority on the labor aspects of balance, revenues and public health;
- 2010–2015: the order of priority on aspects of state revenues, public health, and labor;
- 2015–2020: order of priority on the public health aspects, labor and state revenues.
- Vision and Direction of Development of Tobacco Industry

Realization of Tobacco Industry strong and competitive in the domestic and global markets with attention to health aspects.

== Policy direction ==
In order to achieve its goals for the development of national industry through triple track (pro-growth, pro-job, pro-poor), then the policy is directed at the development of TP:

- Creation of business certainty and a conducive business climate
- The growth in the short term (until 2009) preferred to tobacco-hand-made-products
- Increased export
- Handling of illegal cigarettes
- Improved structure of the tobacco industry
- Imposition of excise planned, conducive and moderate

== Indicators of achievement ==
- Increased cigarette production to 240 billion cigarettes in 2010 and 2025 amounted to 260 billion sticks
- Increasing the value of tobacco exports by 15% / year from U.S. $397.08 million in 2008 to U.S. $1,056.24 million in 2015
- Increased exports of cigarettes and cigars by 15% / year from U.S. $401.44 million in 2008 to U.S. $1,067.84 million in 2015
- Increased export of tobacco and tobacco products, especially to countries that are developing, Europe (cigars and tobacco), ex-Soviet Union, Africa, the US and Asia
- Creation of varieties of tobacco plants and tobacco products that have a low level of risk to health; and
- Decreased production and distribution of illegal cigarettes.

== Problems facing Tobacco Industry ==
Tobacco Industry has remained an important role in growing the national economy, especially in the area of tobacco, cloves and cigarette production centers, among others, in growing industries/related services, the provision of agri-business field and employment. In the economic crisis, the TP is able to survive and neither conduct Termination of Employment (FLE), even this industry is able to provide a significant contribution to state revenue. In its development, the economic aspect is still a major consideration with regard to health impacts posed. Tobacco Industry has priority to be developed for processing natural resources, large enough to absorb labor either directly or indirectly, so as to contribute to state revenue (excise). Nevertheless, faced with today's TP issues include the impact of smoking on health issues both at the global level which is sponsored by the WHO as stated in Framework Convention on Tobacco Control (FCTC) and the national tobacco control set out in PP 19 of 2003 on securing of cigarettes for health. In addition, the TP is also faced with the excise policy issues that are not well-planned, it is not transparent and is more oriented towards the increase in state revenue without considering the ability of the tobacco industry and people's purchasing power, increased production and circulation illegal cigarettes. It is also the main problem is not the realization of the tobacco industry climate distorted competition, the supply of tobacco that does not meet the requirements and low quality. Each of these issues makes the appearance of the TP is currently not optimal. Climate uncontrolled competition resulted in the TP, particularly middle-class tobacco industry need protection from the government in order to grow. As well as the main raw material (tobacco and clove) still do not have the standard technical specifications as required industry. Consequently, the industry must bear the cost of re-grouping in order to be properly utilized in industrial processes.

== Contributions to GDP ==
As one source of state income, excise has a very important contribution in the budget, especially in a group of Domestic Revenue. Customs receipts collected from three types of goods, namely; ethyl alcohol, beverages containing ethyl alcohol and tobacco products to revenue as reflected in the State Budget is increasing from year to year. In the 1990–1991, tax revenue was only Rp 1.8 trillion or contributes about 4 percent of domestic revenue, in the 1999–2000 the number has increased to Rp 10.4 trillion, accounted for 7.3 percent of domestic revenue. In 2003, the tax revenues were set at Rp 27.9 trillion or 8.3 percent of domestic revenue. Indonesia accounted for 2.1% of the stock of tobacco in the world. Tobacco Industry to contribute to state revenue through excise. In terms of state revenue in the form of foreign exchange, the value of exports of tobacco and tobacco products also plays an important role. Tobacco Industry has contributed greatly to employment as well as one of the objects that can be used as a source of revenue associated with Tobacco Excise. More specifically, the cigarette industry has contributed most to the Indonesian state budget, the value contribution of excise duty for the year amounted to 35 trillion RP with a total production of 180 billion cigarettes (data GAPRI ytd September 2008). The cigarette industry is promising with an average growth of 5-7% / year (TEMPO Interactive, December 10, 2008). Within a production of it when converted to the number of consumers, there are approximately 41 million people (assuming average smokers spend one pack/day).

== See also ==
- List of tobacco products
- WHO Framework Convention on Tobacco Control
