= Haik Nikogosian =

Azerbaijani politician (born 1955)

- Born: 1955 (age 70–71)
- Employer: World Health Organization

Haik Nikogosian (born 1955) is an Armenian physician, politician and a public and global health expert.

Nikogosian was founding chairman of the National Institute of Health of Armenia from 1992 to 1994, and served as the Armenian minister of health from 1998 to 2000.

He held managerial positions with the World Health Organization (WHO) Regional Office for Europe from 2000 to 2007, and was head of noncommunicable diseases and lifestyles for part of that time.

He was the founding head of the secretariat of the WHO Framework Convention on Tobacco Control from 2007 to 2014, and was designated as head, emeritus, of the secretariat by the decision of the Conference of the Parties in 2018.

Between 2014 and 2017, he was special representative of the WHO Regional Director for Europe and acting WHO special representative (2015–2017) to the Russian Federation.

From 2017 Nikogosian is a senior fellow at the Global Health Centre, the Graduate Institute of International and Development Studies in Geneva, Switzerland, and writes and lectures internationally in the area of global health.
