= List of smoking bans in Australia =

A pictogram often used to denote a smoking ban

Federal law bans smoking in all Australian Commonwealth government buildings, public transport, airports, and international and domestic flights. Australia banned smoking on domestic flights in December 1987, on international flights within Australian airspace in 1990, and in 1996 banned smoking on all Australian international flights.

Further bans are in place but are governed by individual states. Currently all Australian states and territories have banned smoking in vehicles with children, in some enclosed public places, particularly most major company-owned workplaces, and most enclosed restaurants. Tobacco products cannot be sold or supplied to persons under 18 years old, but there is no legal age to use them.

The Australian Government has made very few laws on electronic cigarettes and leaves such policy up to the states.

== States and territories ==
=== Australian Capital Territory ===
On 6 December 1995, the Australian Capital Territory (ACT) banned smoking in cafes and restaurants, the first jurisdiction in Australia to do so. Since 1 December 2006 a smoking ban has applied to all enclosed public places.

The laws were extended to prohibit smoking in most outdoor eating areas starting in December 2010. Exceptions to this rule can be made but only under certain guidelines. A "Designated Outdoor Smoking Area" (DOSA) requirements include; may not encompass more than 50% of the outdoor area, must be separated from smoke-free areas by no less than 4 metres or a non-transparent fixed wall barrier at least 3 metres high.

In June 2023, any/all smoking in prisons within the Australian Capital Territory are officially banned by subordinate legislation - to be inline/uniform with all other jurisdictions across Australia.

The Australian Capital Territory's only adult prison, the Alexander Maconochie Centre, banned smoking in August 2023.

=== New South Wales ===
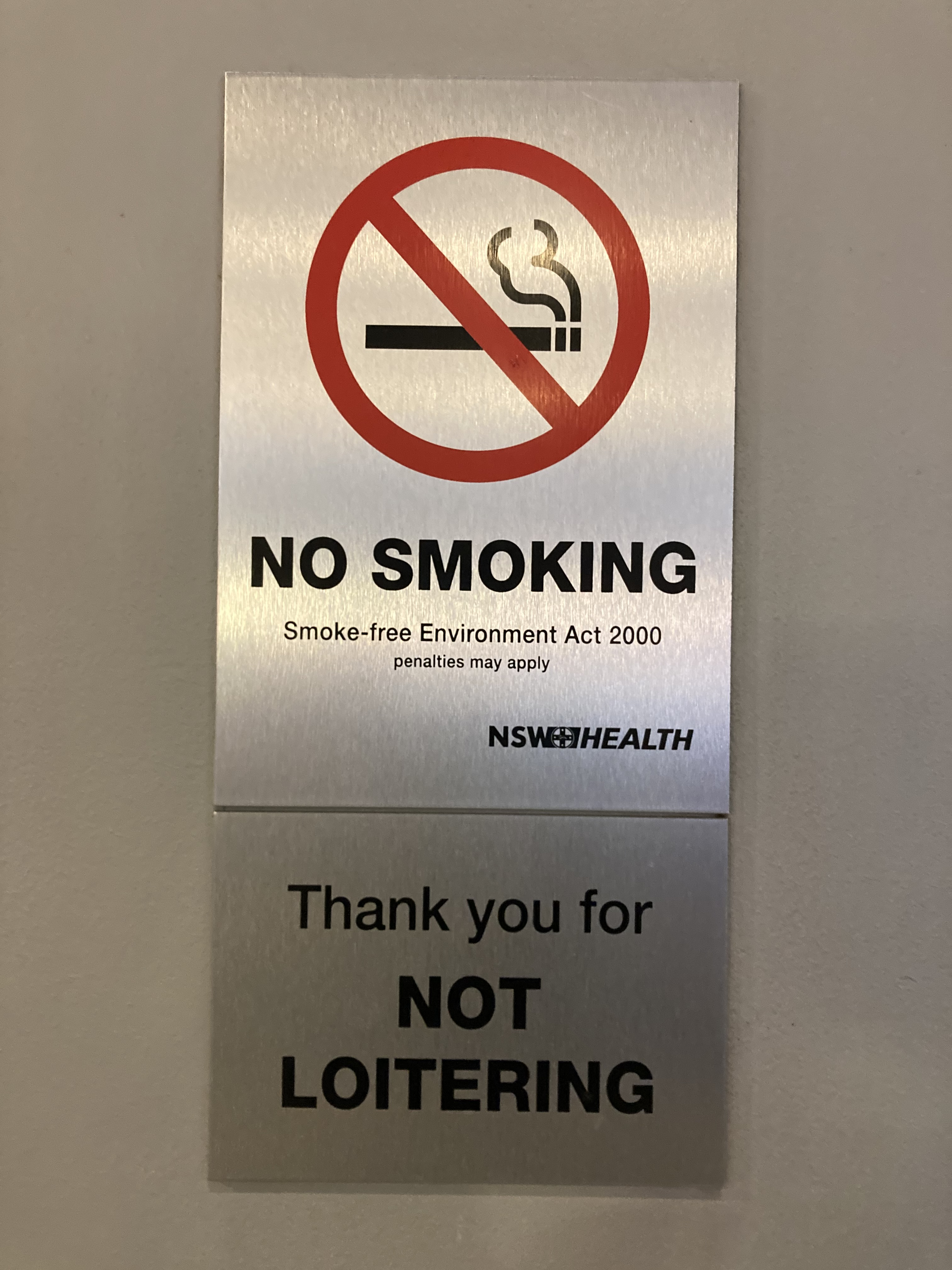
Sign informing people of New South Wales' smoking ban

On 6 September 2001, New South Wales banned smoking in enclosed public areas, except for bars and licensed premises. The Government introduced a total "enclosed space" ban in New South Wales on 1 July 2007. A public place is considered substantially enclosed only if the total area of ceiling and wall surfaces are more than 75% of its total notional ceiling and wall area. Windows and doors may be counted as open space only if they are locked open to the outside for the duration of trading hours. 10% of the total ceiling and wall area must remain open to the elements at all times.

Since 1 July 2009, smoking in a car with someone under the age of 16 has also been against the law. The Public Health (Tobacco) Act 2008 creates an offence of smoking in a car with a child under 16 years of age in the vehicle. A $250 on-the-spot fine applies to the driver and any passenger who breaks the law. However licence premises may set aside an outdoor smoking area for drinking only and must be 4 metres away from restaurant tables and no more than 75% enclosed.

Since 7 January 2013, smoking has been banned at public (outdoor) playgrounds within 10 metres of children's play equipment, in open areas of public swimming pools, at major sports grounds, within 4 m of any building open to the public and at public transport stops (including outdoor parts of railway stations, bus stops, light rail stops and taxi ranks). Bans on smoking within 4 metres of a pedestrian access point to a public building, including seated areas, restaurants and cafés has been in effect since 6 July 2015.

Smoking has been banned at correctional facilities within the state since 10 August 2015.

=== Norfolk Island ===
Smoking is banned in all government buildings, tour buses, taxis and flights to and from Norfolk Island. There is no law on smoking in restaurants, but many are smoke-free; however, they often have a dedicated smoking room for people that wish to smoke. Smoking is permitted in all bars and licensed premises. Resorts and motels have smoking rooms and areas for smokers.

=== Northern Territory ===
Certain restrictions on smoking in enclosed areas of restaurants, licensed clubs and pubs came into force in the Northern Territory on 2 January 2010. Areas such as pubs, clubs and restaurants can now only have 50% of their premises a smoking room/area. The Northern Territory is also the last jurisdiction In Australia that still allows smoking inside certain areas of schools providing children do not have access to that area. In the Northern Territory it is common for bars in rural areas to disobey the smoking bans that the government has put into place although fines can be issued ranging from $1000 to $8000.

Northern Territory became the first jurisdiction to ban smoking in correctional facilities when it introduced a total ban on cigarettes in the institutions on 1 July 2013.

=== Queensland ===
Queensland banned smoking in all pubs, clubs, restaurants and workplaces, as well as in commercial outdoor eating and drinking areas and in outdoor public places (e.g., patrolled beaches, children's playground equipment, major sport stadiums, and within 4 metres of non-residential building entrances). Since 1 July 2006, premises holding a hotel, club or casino liquor licence can designate up to 50% of the outdoor liquor licensed area as a smoking and drinking area. In this area no food or drink can be served, no food can be consumed, no entertainment can be offered and there must be no gaming machines provided. A "buffer", which can be either a 2-metre-wide area or a 2.1-metre-high screen that is impervious to smoke, must be on the area's perimeter wherever it is adjacent to other parts of the outdoor area usually accessed by patrons. Premises that choose to have such an area must have a smoking management plan for the premises that complies with legislative requirements. For all other outdoor eating or drinking places, smoking has been prohibited since 1 July 2006. Since 1 January 2010, the Queensland Government banned smoking in cars where children under the age of 16 are present.

In 2014, Queensland banned tobacco in correctional facilities, following the Northern Territory. The government said it would benefit staff and prisoners. There is debate around the effectiveness of this ban in promoting long-term cessation for those released from prison, as there are high rates of smoking relapse. Some prisoners in Queensland are getting around the prison smoking bans by creating and smoking "teabacco", which is nicotine patches or lozenges mixed with tea leaves, and rolled up in Bible paper. A forensic analysis of teabacco made from nicotine lozenges identified some potentially toxic compounds, but concluded that teabacco made from nicotine lozenges may be less harmful than traditional tobacco cigarettes.

=== South Australia ===
South Australia banned smoking in enclosed public place on 1 November 2007. Under the SA Tobacco Products Regulation Act 1997, a place or area is only "enclosed" if it is fully enclosed or is at least partially covered by a ceiling and has walls such that the total area of the ceiling and wall surfaces exceeds 70 per cent of the total notional ceiling and wall area. It is illegal to smoke in cars while children (under 16) are passengers. Since April 2012, smoking is not allowed beneath covered public transport waiting areas, including bus, tram, train and taxi shelters.

South Australia banned smoking inside prison cells starting in January 2015. Smoking in public outdoor dining areas has been banned in South Australia since July 2016 (the second-to-last state to do so). All South Australian prisons had banned smoking by the end of 2019.

=== Tasmania ===
Tasmania was the first Australian state to introduce a total indoor smoking ban in January 2006. As of 1 January 2008, smoking in cars with passengers under the age of 18 is banned and will incur a $110 on the spot fine. (The laws would be strictly enforced only after a three-month education period.). Smoking has been banned in all outdoor restaurants since 2012, however outdoor areas of licensed premises are exempt from the ban.

Tasmania has banned smoking in correctional facilities since January 2015.

The cities of Hobart and Clarence banned smoking on the main street since 2020 and 2022 respectively, however this is often unenforced with residents often seen smoking tobacco, cannabis and vaping within urban centres.

=== Victoria ===
1973 and 2007 ABC news reports on the initial, and then the complete, indoor smoking bans in Victoria

Victoria banned smoking in enclosed public places on 1 July 2007. Smoking is permitted in non-enclosed drinking areas if the area has a roof and walls that cover no more than 75% of the total notional wall area (i.e. if the combined wall and roof space is 25% open to the outdoors). Smoking is also allowed in: balconies; verandas; smoking rooms in motels; private business; courtyards; outdoor shopping malls; personal living areas in residential care facilities; marquees; and footpaths. Smoking is permitted in high roller rooms and certain smoking rooms of the Crown Casino. A ban on smoking in cars carrying children (aged under 18) became effective since 1 January 2010. Smoking is prohibited on all areas of train stations and raised platform tram stops as of 1 March 2014. A ban on smoking within 4 metres of school entrances became effective in May 2015.

Victoria has banned smoking in correctional facilities since July 2015.

Effective 1 August 2017, the Tobacco Amendment Act 2016 amended the Tobacco Act 1987 to ban smoking at all outdoor dining areas when food is available for consumption.

=== Western Australia ===
Western Australia banned smoking in all indoor areas of pubs, bars and clubs on 31 July 2006. Smoking bans apply in outdoor eating areas, where people eat and/or drink sitting at tables (e.g. restaurants, cafes, delis, lunch-bars and hotels). Smoking is banned within 10 metres of any children's playground equipment. Smoking is prohibited “between the flags” on a beach in patrolled swimming areas. It is also illegal to smoke in a car if a child (aged under 17) is inside. Liquor licensed premises that are not subject to a restaurant licence may set aside up to 50 per cent of outdoor eating areas as smoking zones. Smoking is permitted in the international room and pearl room at the Burswood Casino. The Health Minister has regulated to allow footpath drinking without food to accommodate smokers.

In March 2024, Western Australia banned smoking in all women's prisons; smoking bans in men's prisons are also planned for a later date.

== Comparison ==
Ban	Federal	ACT	NSW	NI	NT	Qld	SA	Tas	Vic	WA
Enclosed public places	Partial	Yes	Yes	Partial	Partial	Yes	Yes	Yes	Yes	Yes
Airports	Yes									
Commonwealth public buildings	Yes									
Domestic and international flights	Yes									
Public transport	Yes									
Private health facilities	No	No	No	No	No	Yes	No	?	No	?
Outdoor public places	No	No	Partial	No	Partial	Partial	Partial	Partial	Partial	Partial
BBQ and picnic areas	No	Yes	No	No	?	≤ 10 m	No	?	No	No
Beaches	No	No	No	No	?	Yes	No	?	No	?
Campsites	No	No	No	No	No	≤ 10 m	No	No	No	No
Child care facilities	No	No	No	No	?	≤ 5 m	No	No	Yes	?
Children's play equipment	No	No	≤ 10 m	No	?	Yes	≤ 10 m	?	Yes	Yes
Commercial drinking areas (such as partly enclosed outdoor bars and cafés that sell alcoholic and non alcoholic beverages and snacks only)	No	?	?	No	?	?	No	?	No	50% of outdoor area only
Commercial eating areas	No	Yes	Yes	No	?	Yes	Yes	?	Yes	?
All enclosed areas of Casinos	No	?	?	No	No	?	No	?	No	No
Jetties and boat ramps	No	No	No	No	No	≤ 10 m	No	No	No	No
Outside of health facilities	No	No	Partial	No	?	≤ 5 m	No	?	Within 4 metres of entrance	?
Outside of toilet blocks	No	No	No	No	No	≤ 10 m	No	No	No	No
Pedestrian entrances to non-residential buildings	No	No	≤ 4 m	No	?	≤ 5 m	No	?	No	?
Pedestrian malls	No	No	No	No	No	Yes	No	No	No	No
Public transport stops and platforms	No	No	Yes	No	?	≤ 5 m	Covered waiting areas only	?	Partial	?
Schools	No	Government schools	No	No	?	≤ 5 m	No	?	Government schools	?
Skate parks	No	No	No	No	?	≤ 10 m	No	?	Yes	?
Sporting events (Note: Spectator areas at sports grounds or other recreational areas used for organised sporting events)	No	Partial	Yes	No	?	Yes	?	?	Certain children's events only	?
Swimming pools	No	Yes	?	Yes	No	?	Yes	?		
Visitor information centres	No	No	No	≤ 10 m	No	No	No	No		
Private vehicles	No	With children < 16	With children < 16	No	?	With children < 16	With children < 16	?	With children < 18	Children under 17
Prisons	N/A: Australia has no federal prisons	Yes	Yes	Yes	Yes	Yes	Yes	Yes	Yes	Women's prisons; ban in men's prisons pending implementation

== See also ==
- Smoking in Australia
