= Illicit cigarette trade =

Trade in tobacco goods which fail to comply with legislation

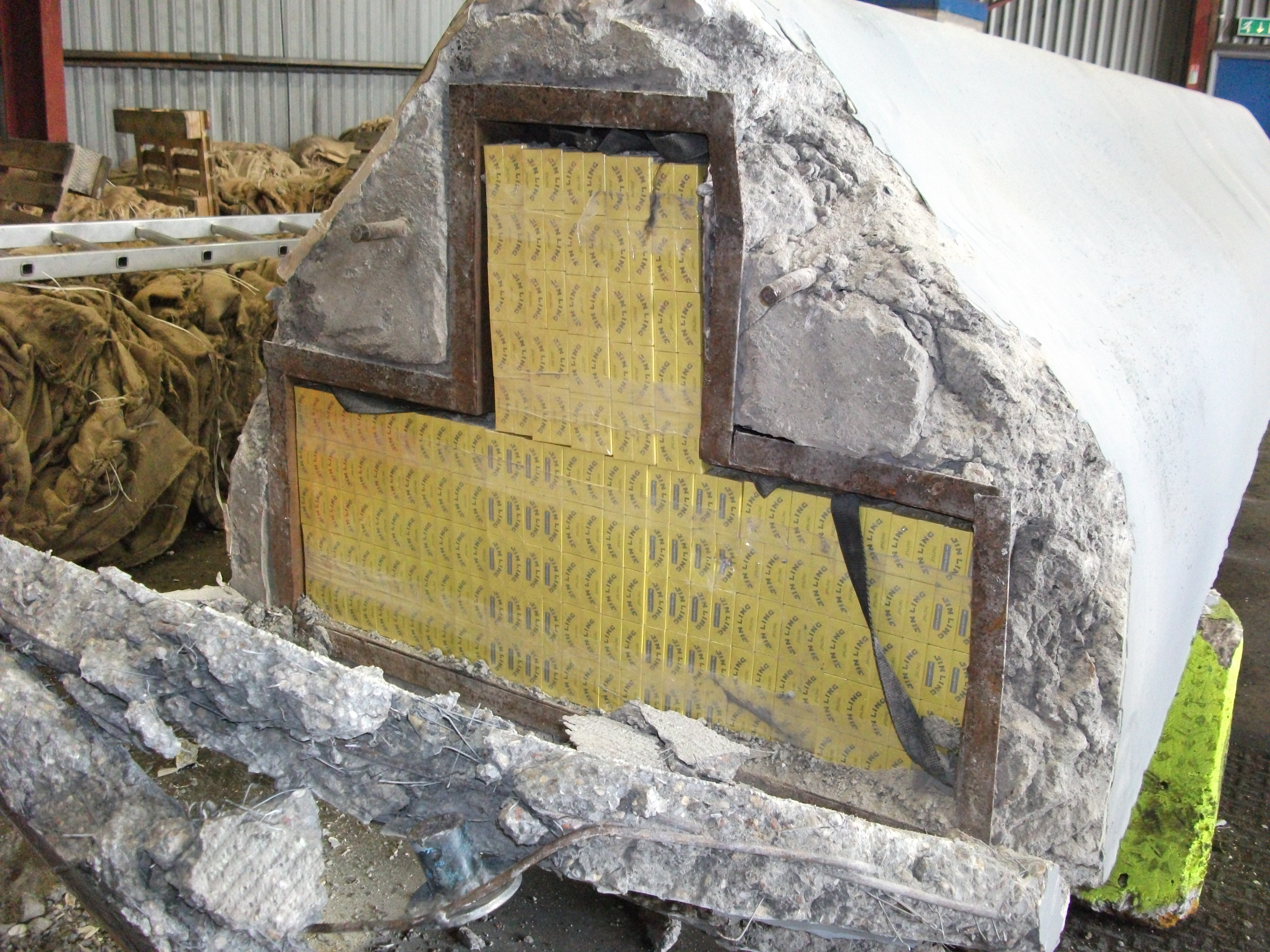
Cigarettes found hidden in concrete blocks

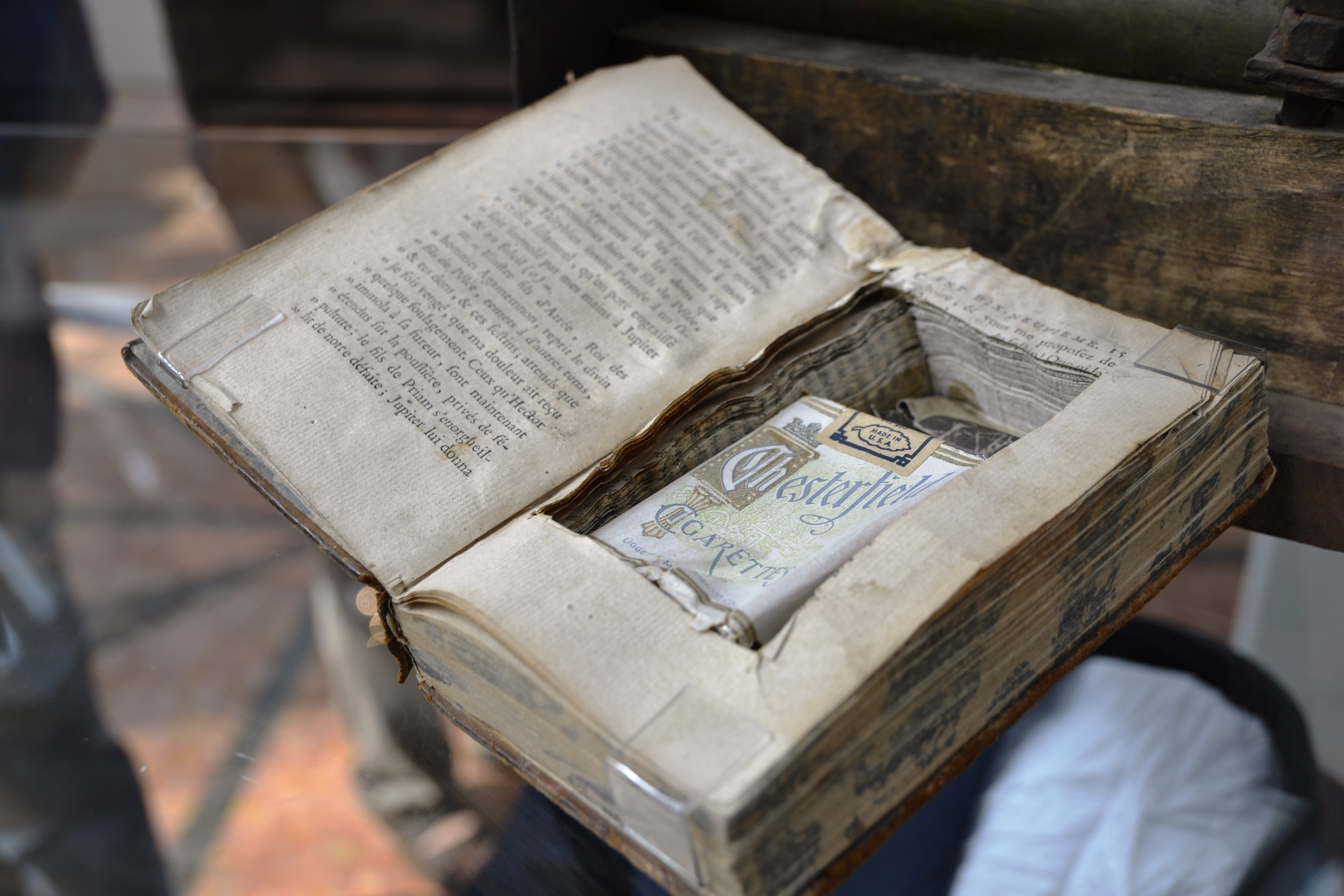
Cigarettes concealed by a hidden compartment cut into a book

The illicit cigarette trade is defined as "the production, import, export, purchase, sale, or possession of tobacco goods which fail to comply with legislation" by the intergovernmental Financial Action Task Force (FATF). Illicit cigarette trade activities fall under 3 categories:

1. Contraband: cigarettes smuggled from abroad without domestic duty paid;
2. Counterfeit: cigarettes manufactured without authorization of the trademark holders, with intent to deceive consumers and to avoid paying duty;
3. Illicit whites: brands manufactured legitimately in one country, but smuggled and sold in another without duties being paid.

Cigarette smuggling, also informally referred to as "buttlegging", is the illicit transportation of cigarettes or cigars from an jurisdiction with low taxation to a jurisdiction with high taxation for sale and consumption. The practice, commonly used by the tobacco industry, organized crime syndicates and rebel groups, is a form of tax evasion. Interstate 95, a highway traversing the East Coast of the United States, came to be known informally as "New Tobacco Road" when it became a favorite cigarette-smuggling route. Illicit cigarette trade is usually criminalized.

== Drivers of illicit trade ==
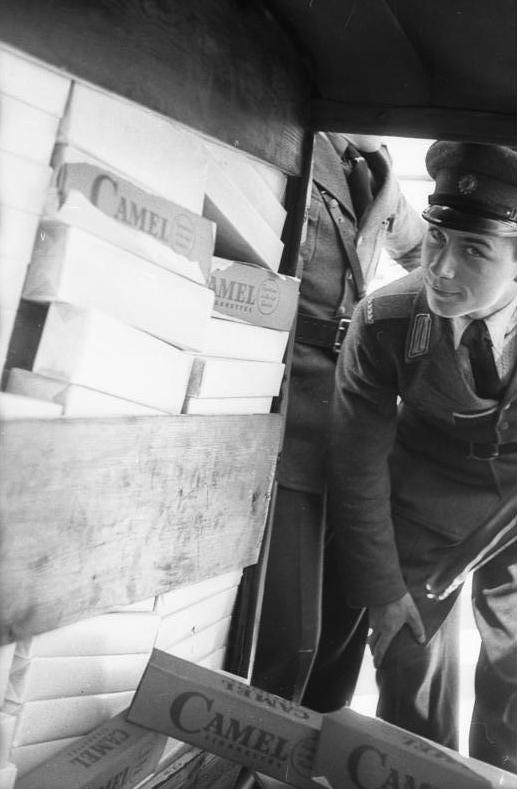
Contraband cigarettes found by police in 1949

The illicit trade of tobacco is both supply and demand driven, as consumers look to save money by evading taxes on tobacco; and suppliers want to take advantage of easy border entry, high profit margins, and weak repercussions if caught. Illegal cigarettes are priced much cheaper than legal cigarettes, and do not undergo stringent regulation in the form of health warnings, product checks, or age verification. Studies highlight that increased tobacco taxes do not dissuade consumers from smoking, rather, addicted smokers turn to cheaper brands and illegal cigarettes. Low costs of production and high levels of demand make illicit cigarettes one of the world's most trafficked illegal goods. In London alone, 85% of smuggled cigarettes were found to be counterfeit, while the UK Border Agency averages more than 1 million counterfeit cigarette seizures per day. Similarly, South Africa reports the incidence of illicit cigarettes has doubled the past 3 years, accounting for 25% of the total market in 2012. Public tolerance and acceptance of illegal cigarettes as a norm also factors into the continued purchase behavior among consumers, as they believe legitimate cigarettes are over-taxed and too expensive.

Illicit cigarettes continue to dominate in Malaysia, where 34.5% of all cigarettes, approximately 7.9 billion sticks, sold were illicit. Illicit trade remains prevalent in Malaysia due to its long coast lines, which allow for shipments to be sent from neighbouring nations, such as kreteks from Indonesia, into the East Malaysian states of Sabah and Sarawak. Smugglers have also become increasingly more efficient in unloading, storing, and distributing smuggled cigarettes in local villages; whilst avoiding customs officers. In Lahad Datu, Sabah, locals have become part of the problem, as they frequently purchase illicit cigarettes from illegal immigrants from the Philippines and Indonesia—who openly peddle these goods in a thriving flea market full of smuggled illicit goods. Lax law enforcement further facilitates the prevalence of illicit trade and smuggled goods in this area, as the sale of these illicit goods are responsible for sustaining the livelihood of these illegal immigrants. The low salaries of responsible law enforcement units are highlighted as a contributing factor to the lack of smuggled cigarette seizures. cigarette smugglers are notified before raids are conducted by Insiders in law enforcement, providing ample time to conceal shipments of illicit cigarettes. With less shipment containers checked upon arrival at ports (due to high volumes of containers), and low penalties for illicit smuggling, this issue will remain prevalent in Malaysia (and other countries with poor border control) as illicit cigarette smuggling continues to be seen as a lucrative, relatively low risk activity.

The implementation of the Plain Packaging Act of tobacco products in 2012 in Australia has sparked debate on its efficacy on reducing the incidence of smoking among youth. While some studies conclude that plain packaging will make cigarettes less attractive to youth, the American Legislative Exchange Council (ALEC) has lobbied against the sale of plain packaged cigarettes—citing lack of evidence. Tobacco organisations instead posit plain packaging will ease the ability of illegal tobacco manufacturers to replicate legitimate products—resulting in higher incidences of illicit trade.

== Links to organized crime and clandestine financiering ==
Numerous reports, have forged links between the illegal tobacco trade and organised crime groups, who are attracted by high consumer demand, high potential profits, and relatively low potential penalties. In Malaysia, first time offence results in up to RM100,000 fine and a 3-year sentence; with a RM200,000 fine and 6-year jail sentence for subsequent offences. Organised crime syndicates garner wide reach through diverse distribution channels in the form of small retailers and street vendors. While retailers may be charged in court if found to be in possession of cigarettes, it has been widely assumed that crime syndicates pay these fines in order to maintain cooperation with retailers, and sustain their distribution network. Beyond these traditional distribution channels, the resale of tobacco products on the Internet is being actively developed—enabling greater reach, more discretion, and lesser chances of being caught. In 2012, French police disrupted this trend through deleting domain names of online trading sites selling tobacco products.

The WCO Illicit Trade Report 2012 highlights the illicit tobacco trade represents a good opportunity for organized crime groups and/or terrorists to generate large sums of criminal profits. Billingslea wrote, terrorist groups work with organized crime groups as well as International drug trafficking organisations due to their "established trafficking routes and business contacts for the transfer of commodity for profit", He adds, known and suspected Hezbollah and Hamas members have established front companies and legitimate businesses in the cigarette trade in Central and South America. The IRA (Irish Republican Army) was one of the first groups to begin using cigarettes to fund their activities. Police estimate that the IRA made $100million in the past 5 years from trafficking illicit cigarettes. In the Middle East, the Kurdish Workers Party (PKK) has known involvement in the trafficking of contraband cigarettes and tax stamps. The EU Commission report that the PKK has been smuggling American cigarettes into Iraq, which were then controlled by Saddam Hussein's son. The combined efforts from cigarette and oil smuggling was reported to have made Saddam Hussein as much as $2.7billion annually after 1991.

Most recently, 16 Palestinian men arrested due to a cigarette smuggling scheme in New York were found to have some ties to convicted terrorists. One criminal in particular, had known financial ties to Omar Abdel-Rahman, a cleric serving a life sentence for a conspiracy to blow up New York City landmarks. Others arrested also had ties to a top Hamas official.

Similarly in Hong Kong, police arrested 1,200 individuals from a wide range of gangs for drug trafficking, illegal possession of arms, and contraband cigarettes. Operation Thunderbolt, which aims to target triads in Hong Kong and neighboring provinces, has been successful in infiltrating various branches of the gang's operational networks.

The World Customs Organisation (2013) notes that while the number of illegal cigarette seizures has increased globally, the number of smuggling routes and channels continue to diversify accordingly. In Ireland, four men were recently caught transporting 9 million cigarettes with a retail value of €4.3 million, which arrived via sea freight from Malaysia. Police believe this shipment was destined for Ireland's largest smuggling gangs, who have also been involved in armed robberies and burglaries. In the United Kingdom, cigarette smuggling has become so increasingly profitable that smuggling syndicates have turned to bribing young women to smuggle cigarettes in exchange for free summer holidays. UK border officials have revealed that close to 50 million cigarettes are seized each month from girls as young as 15, who were given flights to Spain, accommodation and pocket money. Cigarette smuggling has since become one of Europe's fastest growing forms of organized crime, and has been responsible for funding larger operations such as drug smuggling or people trafficking. South Africa faces similar problems with cigarette smuggling, as police report the sale of illegal cigarettes is bigger than drugs in South Africa.

== Costs of illicit trade ==
The global scale of the illegal cigarette trade has reached an all-time high, as governments are estimated to lose over US$50 billion in global government revenues each year. A Euromonitor (2011) report estimates that there are 360 billion cigarettes consumed annually (excluding China), which accounts for 10% of the global market. Euromonitor (2013) reports black market sales of cigarettes rose for the 6th year in a row, although cigarette consumption in the EU fell by 5.7% in 2012—resulting in over 12 billion Euros in lost tax revenue. Illicit cigarette trade not only deprives the government of a key source of tax revenue, but also creates an imbalance in the market for legitimate industry players who operate within stringent regulations. In Asia-Pacific (and globally) Malaysia ranks as the country with the highest share (45%) of illicit cigarettes in the total market, followed by Hong Kong (35%), and Pakistan (26.7%) in the Asian continent. Although illegal cigarettes have been associated with low-income groups, its low price and accessibility also makes it attractive to smokers in general due to increasing tobacco taxes, and affordable for youths—who have lower disposable income. Brunei illustrates a unique case globally, where 89.8%, or 315.2 million of cigarettes consumed are illicit. After the government's 339% excise duty application in 2010, cigarette prices hit $6.1 per pack, one of the highest in the Asia Pacific after Singapore and Australia. This resulted in the withdrawal of major international tobacco firms, and a tax loss of $63 million due to the proliferating illicit market. Tobacco Atlas estimates that if illicit trade was eliminated, $31.3 billion in tax revenue would be gained, and 164,000 premature deaths would be avoided annually due to higher average cigarette prices. The WCO recommends placing greater importance on information collection and sharing on a national and International level in order to develop strategies to respond to this threat.

== Societal impacts of illicit trade ==
=== Youth smoking ===
Costs of illicit trade also go beyond purely financial measures, with repercussions such as encouraging youth uptake of smoking, and increasing health risks for consumers, as illegal cigarettes are not bound by product and ingredient checks. Despite industry and government efforts to implement ID checks for tobacco sales to regulate availability, the prominence of illicit cigarette trade facilitates cigarette affordability for youth; with its lower-than-market price, and provision of easy channels for purchase in the form of small retailers and online. Internet sites have since become a core channel of distribution as it allows the selling and shipping of small quantities of cigarettes undetected by Customs Officials. Numerous studies also draw a direct link between the availability of cheap illicit cigarettes and the high youth smoking rates. In Canada, illegal cigarettes accounted for 17.5% of all cigarettes smoked by adolescents, with greater prevalence in Toronto and Quebec, where 22% of Canadian high school students regularly smoke illegal cigarettes. The study adds illegal cigarettes were responsible for providing an accessible alternative to quitting, and for youth in particular, encourages initiation and continuation of smoking over the long term.

=== Dangerous additives ===
The ICC (International Chamber of Commerce) warns counterfeit cigarettes were found to contain unsanitary ingredients (such as human feces, dead flies and mold), as well as a higher dosage of lethal substances in excess of legitimate cigarettes. Illicit cigarettes seized in Canada and the United Kingdom were found to contain five times more cadmium, six times as much lead, 160% more tar, and 133% more carbon monoxide. Consumers are warned to take caution and avoid the temptation to save money by purchasing illegal cigarettes as it poses greater health risks compared to legal cigarettes.

== Identifying illicit cigarettes ==
Below are some common indicators of illicit cigarette packs:

- The absence of pictorial health warnings
- Poor detailing on cigarettes (print, spelling errors, inconsistent lettering)
- Packs without domestic tax stamps or security marks
- Packs with non-domestic tax stamps
- Unlisted importer or manufacturer
- Unregistered brands
- Pack sizes with less than 20 cigarettes
- Unusual taste
- Cheap price (below market average)
- Not on the Trusted Trade Network database (individual product verification)

== Illicit trade around the world ==
=== Australia ===
The country's attempts to discourage smoking through higher taxes have fueled the illegal cigarette industry, leading to a $1.1 billion loss of taxes due to illegal cigarettes in 2012.

In May 2016, it was estimated that possibly 14.3 percent of tobacco consumed in Australia was bought through the black market and the cost in loss of revenue earned from taxes each year was $1.4 billion.

In the years 2023–2024, the illicit tobacco trade grew to become a 4 billion dollar industry and pushed the total economic toll of organized crime in the country to over 80 billion. Australian authorities have also inferred that the $4 billion figure is a conservative estimate of the overall revenue of the black market industry, as this figure does not include illegal vapes and e-cigarettes.

In 2025 the Australian government alleged that the illicit tobacco trade had reached "crisis levels" in the country. 2025 also saw the illicit tobacco's trade first civilian death in the tobacco war, Katie Tangey was murdered in January 2025 in a home that was firebombed. However Tangey and the home in question was not the original target, with Australian authorities ruling the death and firebombing of the property an unfortunate case of mistaken identity.

=== Belarus ===
Belarus is characterized as "the main provider of contraband cigarettes in Europe". In 2017, European Commissioner Günther Oettinger stated that nearly 10% of illicit cigarettes in the European Union originate from Belarus. Lithuanian and Polish customs often report about big consignments of cigarettes found with other goods and stated that the smuggling is a serious problem. Customs in Latvia and Ukraine also reported about thousands of confiscated packs of cigarettes from Belarus but on a much smaller scale. Besides European Union, another important destination of smuggling from Belarus is Russia. It is assumed that smuggling is an important revenue generator for the regime of Alexander Lukashenko. Aliaksei Aleksin, a businessman with close ties to Lukashenko, is called among the main alleged organizers of the smuggling industry. Organized crime groups are also reported to be active in this industry. Local citizens are common among ordinary performers of smuggling who cross the Belarus-EU border by cars, trucks and trains. It is estimated that one truck can transport around 4 million packs of cigarettes. Rafts with GPS tracking systems and low-flying drones are used occasionally.

The smugglers prefer to transport inexpensive Belarusian brands of cigarettes which enjoy much smaller excise rates in Belarus than higher-segment cigarettes. Significant amounts of Belarusian cigarettes produced by state-owned Grodno tobacco factory for local market (Minsk Capital, NZ, Fest and others) were found not only in neighboring markets but also in distant countries having no borders with Belarus such as Ireland and UK. It was estimated that 12% of cigarettes smuggled out of Belarus ended up in the UK.

Cigarettes in Belarus are several times cheaper than in the European Union. In 2016, according to BBC, a pack of cigarettes bought in Belarus for c. 40p could be sold in the UK for £3. In 2017, it was estimated that total losses of the member states of the EU due to smuggling from Belarus amounted to roughly EUR 1 billion every year.

=== Belgium ===
The country is the host of several case of "white" smuggling mainly from Belgium to France / United Kingdom due to their lower taxes (which makes up to 50% less expensive).

=== Canada ===
As of 2022, illegal cigarettes are an estimated 2 billion dollar plus industry in Canada. In Canada, between 63 and 79 percent of the price of a package of cigarettes is tax. Many border-goers take advantage of the situation, not only in Canada but also in the U.S., the land that has traditionally imported rather than exported illegal goods. Canadian provinces with lower tobacco taxes have reported higher rates of smuggling, and much of the smuggling is dominated by First Nations members (though the bulk of First Nations members and leadership have opposed and condemned tobacco smuggling).

=== Hong Kong ===
- Customs officers seized 1.3 million illicit cigarettes (total market value of $3.3million with a duty potential of $2.2million) in electric water heaters in an industrial building.
- Hong Kong Police arrest 1,200 suspects on charges ranging from drug trafficking, illegal possession of arms, drugs, and contraband cigarettes.

=== Indonesia ===
In 2024, due to an increase in cigarette excises, illicit cigarettes became more commonly smoked in Indonesia, with an estimated 46 percent of consumption being untaxed with a loss in potential government revenues reaching Rp 97.8 trillion (USD 6 billion).

Most illegal cigarette brands in Indonesia, if not all, often uses funny names and resembling those of existing cigarette brands, like Djaran Goyang (← Djarum Super), Magbul Premium (← Dji Sam Soe Magnum Filter, cf. animated series Riska dan Si Gembul), Gudang Gabah (←Gudang Garam), Mildboro (← Marlboro), Men Doan, SMD Bold (← Djarum Super MLD), and others.

=== Ireland ===
In Ireland the Irish Republican Army smuggled cigarettes to raise money for weapons and equipment. It may be associated with other criminal activity, for example:

- 9 million cigarettes with an estimated retail value of 4.3 million euros were seized when 4 men were caught transporting the shipment, which arrived at Dublin Port, from Malaysia. Police believe the cigarettes were destined for one of the country's largest smuggling gangs, which have also been involved in armed robberies and burglaries.

In the Republic of Ireland, cigarette prices are amongst the highest in the world due to heavy excise tax: typically €15 (US$12.70, £9.70) for a pack of twenty. Because of this, a heavy incentive is created for smuggling from the European Union mainland, where the same pack can cost far less (e.g. Spain €5, or in Eastern Europe €3–€4). Larger operators can purchase a shipping container full of cigarettes in Asia for €300,000, selling the tobacco on for as much as €5 million. Smuggled packs are sold for €4–€5, with Dublin's Moore Street a notorious site. Criminal gangs earn over €350 million a year from the trade, with one-quarter of tobacco smoked in Ireland being smuggled.

In 2012, 96 million cigarettes were seized by Revenue Commissioners, dropping to 45 million in 2016. Higher security levels in airports have pushed criminals to using other methods to import tobacco, such as car ferries.

=== Jordan ===
In August 2019, the Jordanian government tightened the customs regulations, citing the soaring smuggling of cigarettes to Syria for profit. The move gave rise to anti-government violence, where a clash erupted between the government and the protesters in the northern city of Ar-Ramtha.

=== Malaysia ===
- Malaysia records RM1.9 billion loss to illegal cigarettes in 2012.
- Locals at Lahad Datu help fuel demand for illicit goods through frequent purchase of illicit cigarettes from illegal immigrants in an open illegal goods flea market.

=== Montenegro ===
In the Former Yugoslavia, Montenegro was known for being a haven for cigarette smuggling into Italy.

=== Palestine ===
- 16 Palestinian men arrested in a scheme that may have generated $55 million in revenue from selling illicit cigarettes.

=== Paraguay ===
Due to discrepancies in the cigarette tax rate between Brazil and Paraguay (16% in Paraguay vs. 80% in Brazil), large quantities of cigarettes are smuggled into Brazil via Santa Catarina. Journalists have alleged that the Tabacalera Del Este factory owned by relatives of Paraguayan President Horacio Cartes, in responsible for producing cigarettes for the purpose of being smuggled into Brazil via Ciudad del Este.

Contraband cigarettes from Paraguay are also widespread in Argentina and Chile.

=== Spain ===
- 16,500 kg (worth 2 million Euros) of shredded tobacco was seized at an illegal cigarette factory located in an abandoned building in an industrial park.

=== Ukraine ===
A 700-meters smuggling tunnel with a narrow gauge railway was revealed in July 2012 between Uzhhorod (Ukraine) and Vyšné Nemecké (Slovakia), at the border of the Schengen Area. The tunnel used professional mining and security technologies. It was used primarily for smuggling of cigarettes.

=== United Kingdom ===
Belarus is believed to be one of the main sources of cigarettes smuggled to the United Kingdom. It was estimated that in 2015, 610 million cigarettes produced in Belarus were smuggled to the United Kingdom and illegally sold there.

An example:

- Haul of illegal tobacco and cigarettes with a shop value of £415,000 seized from 10 storage units in Derby.

=== United States ===
In the United States, each of the fifty states taxes cigarette packs at a different rate. In 1992, states charged an average of 25 cents. By January 2002, that average increased to 45 cents. Six months later, states, trying to compensate for budget deficits, raised their cigarette taxes to an average 54 cents. According to John D'Angelo of the U.S. government's Bureau of Alcohol, Tobacco, and Firearms (ATF), there is a "direct relationship between the increase in a state's tax and an increase in illegal trafficking". This is true with all psychotropic substances and, indeed, all forms of vice that may be desirable to individuals: the more the state or even the national government tries to repress the trade in any legal or illegal substance, the higher the prices, and with them the profit margins, become—and the greater the willingness of illicit marketers to meet the demand, and with it the willingness to commit other violent crimes to prevent the closure of the illicit markets, becomes. This is known as "the forbidden-fruit effect", among other references. The U.S. government foiled funding operations by Al-Qaeda in New York in 1999 and Hezbollah in North Carolina in 2002.

It has been reported that smuggling one truckload of cigarettes within the United States can lead to a profit of US$2 million.

Laws specifically pertaining to cigarette smuggling in the United States have included the Contraband Cigarette Trafficking Act of 1978, which makes cigarette smuggling a felony punishable by up to five years in prison.

One of the most notable places of cigarette smuggling in the United States is New York City. There, the cigarette tax is the second highest in the nation, at $6.86 per pack (federal, state, and municipal). Smugglers purchase cigarettes in other lower-tax states, such as nearby Pennsylvania, where the tax rate is only $3.61 per pack. If smugglers travel further to even lower-tax states, they can buy cigarettes for even less, such as Virginia, where the tax is only $0.30 per pack. As stated above, Interstate 95, since New York is one of the states through which it runs, became a favorite route for cigarette smuggling and drew the informal nickname of "New Tobacco Road" from the practice.

Increases in illicit cigarette seizures can follow increases in cigarette tax. The government of Massachusetts banned the sale of menthol cigarettes which has resulted in illicit interstate importation and sales.

== Anti-illicit trade ==
World Health Organization (WHO) – the Protocol to Eliminate Illicit Trade in Tobacco Products is a multilateral treaty aimed at combating the illicit trade in tobacco products through controlling supply chain and international cooperation. Parties commit to establishing tracking and tracing system to reduce, with aims to eradicate, illicit trade. The Protocol has been signed by representatives of all 6 WHO regions.

Get Some Answers (United Kingdom) – a website created by The North England Tackling Illicit Tobacco for Better Health Programme, aims to inform and increase awareness of illegal tobacco, its impact, and consequences. The website provides forums for discussion, link to Crime Stoppers to share information, and link to National Health Service (NHS) for individuals who want to quit smoking.

Retailers Against Smuggling (Ireland) – This body was established in 2009 by Irish retailers to fight against illicit tobacco trade through raising awareness about the effects of illicit tobacco on retailers, liaising with relevant law enforcement authorities, and campaigning for legislative reform and extra law enforcement resources.

Contraband Enforcement Strategy (Canada) – The Royal Canadian Mounted Police aims to nationally reduce the availability of, and decrease the demand for contraband tobacco through working with youth to prevent involvement in crimes as an offender or victim. This published report prioritises reducing the threat of criminal terrorist activity in Canada through effectively addressing contraband activities, disrupting organized crime groups, and enhancing intelligence gathering and sharing

Rokok Tak Sah (Malaysia) – Launched by Royal Malaysian Customs, this campaign is aimed at educating retailers and the public about the penalties of buying and selling illicit cigarettes. Brochures and newspaper advertisements were deployed to raise awareness of how to identify illegal cigarettes. Customs officers also increased enforcement efforts to seize illegal cigarettes and fine retailers facilitating sales to the public.

Don't Get Burnt (Singapore) – This campaign by Singapore Customs seeks to warn the public about the dangers and stiff penalties for activities involving illicit tobacco trade. The campaign encourages citizens to report illegal activities and educates the public about identifying illegal cigarettes through: radio networks, cable television, outdoor and print advertisements, roadshows and community engagement. Efforts resulted in a 30.4% decrease in the number of illegal cigarette buyers caught.

Hong Kong United Against Illicit Tobacco (2013) – This movement aims to consolidate opposition to illicit trade, educate the public to move the issue up the government's priority list, and sell the public on the idea that illicit tobacco only benefits criminals.

Stop Illegal Cigarettes (South Africa) – This campaign, backed by the Tobacco Institute of Southern Africa, comprises tobacco industries working together to tackle illegal cigarette trade among retailers and increasing consumer awareness.

Trusted Trade Network (UK) – This network has been designed to rid the world of counterfeit and illicit goods through multi-stage authentication measures, working from the company straight to the consumer.

== See also ==
- Chop chop (tobacco)
- Human trafficking
- Illegal drug trade
- Protocol to Eliminate Illicit Trade in Tobacco Products, articles 8-13
- Rum-running
- Smuggling
- Tobacco taxation
