= Chop-chop (tobacco) =

Australian term for untaxed illegal tobacco

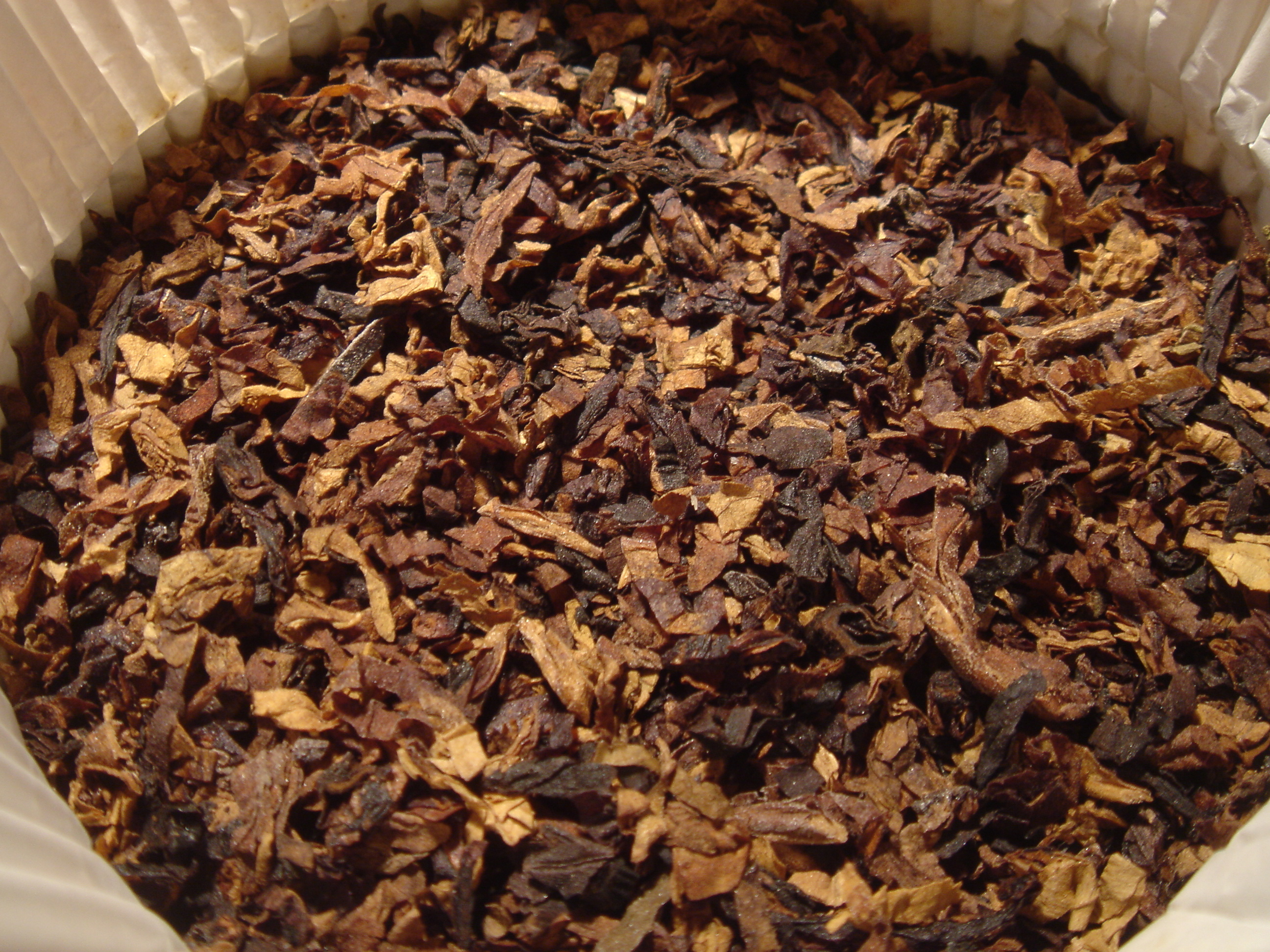
Tobacco

Chop-chop is an Australian term for untaxed illegal tobacco, such as that which is homegrown. It is also called loose tobacco. The practice of using chop-chop emerged in evasion of heavy excise and taxation levies, sharply lowering the cost compared to legally marketed products. The chop-chop industry is by definition illegal and unregulated.

It is considered an inferior product by the consumer to legal tobacco in taste but attractive as its price to the consumer is considerably less.

== Market ==
It is estimated in May 2018, that in Australia about 864 tonnes of chop-chop is sold each year which is about 40% of the total legal Australian market of loose tobacco of 2,150 tonnes a year. In the previous year the Australian Taxation Office seized 117 tonnes. The value of the market ranges from KPMG at $1.6 billion to Rohan Pike Consulting at $3.8 billion a year.

== Health concerns ==
Chop-chop is sometimes viewed as being more healthy than mass-produced branded tobacco. Research suggests that contaminants are common and include twigs and pulp from raw cotton, hay, cabbage leaves, grass clippings and chloride products. One writer has suggested that mould and fungi are also likely to be found in chop-chop samples.

Another claim is that smoking chop-chop has the potential to cause greater illness than branded tobacco and possible fatality in those who use it. This is claimed, largely to the relatively high chance of fungal contamination found in samples of chop-chop. These fungi can cause toxic responses in the lungs, liver, kidneys and skin, with illness ranging from allergic reactions, chronic bronchitis and asthma to lung cancer.

== Possession ==
Because of its illegal nature, chop-chop is often transported and stored in a clandestine manner. In one 2007 incident, a taxation officer inspecting a residence in Mareeba, Queensland noticed that the owner's bedroom floor sounded hollow and discovered a hydraulically operated steel trapdoor concealing an underground bunker that held hundreds of kilograms of chop-chop.

Chop-chop can also find its way into the market via individuals or groups who purchase leaf directly from a tobacco grower, process it for sale and provide it to a range of retailers (such as tobacconists, market stallholders, hairdressers, newsagents and milk bars) for on-selling. Chop-chop is usually sold in half or one kilogram lots, packed into clear plastic bags in loose leaf form.

Buying (or selling) illegal tobacco in Australia is "a serious tax crime", but it appears to be difficult to enforce, as only 107 people have been jailed from July 2018 to December 2025 for tobacco crimes. In this period, the Western Australian police referred only one suspect to prosecution, despite the tobacco grey market being so widespread that the government's tobacco excise is predicted to collapse from $16 billion in 2020 to $2.1 billion in 2029-2030. The numbers include dealers.

== Origins of the term ==
The term "chop-chop" was coined in the mid-1890s by staff at an Australian tobacco manufacturer, W.D. & H.O. Wills Australia Limited, endeavouring to combat the illegal trade. The term comes from the production process of the illicit producers - merely chopping up the cured tobacco leaves.

== See also ==
- Tobacco in Australia
- Cigarette smuggling

== Works cited ==
- Bittoun, Renée (December 2004). The Medical Consequences of Smoking "Chop-Chop" Tobacco (PDF) (Report). Commonwealth Department of Health and Ageing. Archived from the original (PDF) on June 2, 2011.
