= Protocol to Eliminate Illicit Trade in Tobacco Products =

World Health Organization treaty

The Protocol to Eliminate Illicit Trade in Tobacco Products is a 2012 World Health Organization treaty, designed to combat the worldwide illicit tobacco trade. The Protocol is supplementary to the WHO Framework Convention on Tobacco Control.

== Description ==
The Protocol was concluded on 12 November 2012 in Seoul, at the fifth session of the Conference of the Parties to the WHO Framework Convention on Tobacco Control. It was opened for signature on 10 January 2013 and remained so until 9 January 2014. It was signed by 54 states and, as September 2025, has been ratified by or acceded to by 71 parties. The Protocol entered into force on 25 September 2018 after being ratified by its 40th state. Only parties that have ratified the Framework Convention may ratify the Protocol.

The Protocol contains provisions which require a ratifying state to take a variety of measures regarding the tobacco trade, including licensing, tracking and tracing, record-keeping, monitoring and regulating sales by Internet, international transit, and duty-free sales. The Protocol also promotes international co-operation in information sharing, mutual legal assistance, and extradition of persons suspected of involvement in the illicit tobacco trade.

Once it has entered into force, the Protocol will be monitored by the Meeting of the Parties which convenes every other year immediately following the FCTC Conference of the parties.
