= List of smoking bans =

A pictogram is often used to denote a smoking ban.

Smoking bans are public policies, including criminal laws and occupational safety and health regulations, which prohibit tobacco smoking in certain spaces. Laws pertaining to where people may smoke vary around the world.

== Smoking bans by country ==
World map as of August 2021: No known smoke-free restrictions (or no data) Partial smoke-free restrictions, or patchy/inconsistent law enforcement No national smoke-free legislation – some localities have local restrictions National smoke-free legislation for public areas except entertainment and restaurants, or weak enforcement in indoor entertainment areas National smoke-free legislation for public areas except entertainment and restaurants – some localities have additional local restrictions National smoke-free legislation covering all public indoor areas (sometimes with specific exceptions)

=== Albania ===
A law came into effect on 30 May 2007 restricting smoking in closed public areas and outlawing the advertisement of tobacco, although the measure was reportedly poorly enforced in the country until 2013. From 2013, law enforcement has been implemented, and smoking is strictly forbidden in closed public areas, including bars, pubs, restaurants etc. If any of these places are caught allowing a customer to smoke, they are fined €2,200 and the person smoking is fined €350.

=== Andorra ===
Since 2004, smoking is prohibited in government buildings, educational facilities, hospitals, enclosed sport facilities and buses. In 2010, an increase in restrictions at restaurants, bars, and workplaces was under discussion.

Andorra introduced a smoking ban in all public places on 13 December 2012. However, an exception was made for bars and restaurants, allowing special smoking rooms as long as they fulfill strict conditions: such as not serving food and drink. In 2014, Andorra joined France and Spain in banning smoking indoors, which resulted in the first smoke free ski season in Andorra.

In 2017, Andorra was one of the countries with the lowest mortality rate from cardiovascular disease, whose main causes include smoking.

=== Argentina ===
Since 1 June 2011, a smoking ban in all of Argentina prohibits smoking in workplaces, all public indoor areas, schools, hospitals, museums and libraries, theatres, and all public transport. However, smoking is still allowed in balconies, terraces and patios. The law also included the prohibiting of advertising and sponsoring of tobacco. The fine for breaking the law is equivalent to 250 to 1,000,000 packets of the most expensive cigarettes in the market.

=== Armenia ===
A law came into effect in March 2005 prohibiting smoking in hospitals, in cultural, educational and mental institutions, and on public transportation. On 1 March 2006, new rules came into effect requiring all public and private institutions, including bars and restaurants, to allow smoking only in special secluded areas. Absence of any legal sanctions against those who violate the smoking laws has made them completely ineffective. Tobacco advertising is prohibited in TV, radio and outdoor advertising. Other sources of advertising on newspapers, magazines of tobacco products is not fully restricted. Sponsorships are partially allowed in Armenia.

In 2012, Armenia had the third-highest rate of male cigarette smokers in the world. On 11 January 2017, the Eurasian Economic Commission said that starting mid-March 2017, graphic pictures would be implemented on the packaging of cigarettes in all Eurasian Economic Union member states.

An anti-smoking law was passed by the Armenian parliament in February 2020. It bans smoking while driving cars or buses and imposes a ban on tobacco advertising. The ban on smoking in cafes, restaurants and other public catering facilities has entered into force in March 2022. The ban on smoking in half-closed premises of public catering facilities will come into force in May 2024. Meanwhile, the ban on smoking in hotels came into force in May 2020.

=== Australia ===
In Australia, smoking bans are determined on a state-by-state basis. In chronological order by state:

The first place smoking was banned in Victoria was in 1976 when Minister for Transport, Mr Rafferty moved a motion to ban smoking in suburban electric trains, trams and government buses. This was followed by the Shire of Orbost, smoking was banned in the Shire of Orbost offices in 1990. The motion was carried and Orbost was the first public office that had a smoking ban.

- South Australia: Smoking prohibited in all indoor dining areas since January 1999. Banned in all enclosed public places since November 2007.
- Western Australia: Incremental restrictions introduced from January 2005 with a comprehensive total restriction upon smoking in all enclosed public spaces taking effect from July 2006.
- Tasmania: Total indoor smoking ban in force since January 2006. From January 2008 the regulations were extended to include smoking in cars with passengers under the age of 18.
- Queensland: Comprehensive smoking ban in effect since July 2006. Smoking is prohibited in all pubs, clubs, restaurants and workplaces, commercial outdoor eating and drinking areas, outdoor public places, and within 5 metres of non-residential building entrances.
- Australian Capital Territory: A restriction upon smoking in enclosed public places has been in effect since December 2006.
- Victoria: A restriction upon smoking in enclosed public places has been in effect since July 2007. It is also an offence to smoke in a vehicle where there is a person under the age of 18 present, since January 2010. Smoking is still Permitted in all drinking areas providing it is 25% Outdoors and meals are not being served. Private cigar bars and certain rooms of the Crown Casino still permitted smoking in fully enclosed areas providing it has a proper ventilation system.
- New South Wales: A restriction upon smoking in all enclosed areas of restaurants, licensed clubs and pubs came into force in July 2007. From 1 July 2009, smoking in a car with a child under the age of 16 is against the law. The Public Health (Tobacco) Act 2008 creates a new offence of smoking in a car with a child under 16 years of age in the vehicle. A$250 on-the-spot fine applies to the driver and any passenger who breaks the law. This is enforced by NSW Police.
- Northern Territory: Certain restrictions upon smoking in enclosed areas of restaurants, licensed clubs and pubs came into force on 2 January 2010.
- Norfolk Island: Smoking is banned in all government buildings, tour buses, taxis and flights to and from the island. There is no law on smoking in restaurants but many are smokefree, however, they often have a dedicated smoking room for people that wish to smoke. Smoking is permitted in all bars and licensed premises. Resorts and motels have smoking rooms and areas for smokers.

Smoking has been banned in all prisons in Queensland, the Northern Territory, Tasmania, Victoria, and New South Wales since 2015. All South Australian prisons had banned smoking by the end of 2019. The Australian Capital Territory's only adult prison, the Alexander Maconochie Centre, banned smoking in August 2023. In March 2024, Western Australia banned smoking in all women's prisons; smoking bans in men's prisons are also planned for a later date.

=== Austria ===
In 2009, smoking was prohibited by law in all enclosed public spaces and educational institutions. The 2009 law granted certain exceptions for eating and drinking establishments as well as workplaces if no employee works in the enclosed space objects. Smoking was banned on trains and in railway stations when Germany introduced a similar smoking ban in 2007. The 2009 law mandated that all restaurants, bars, discos, and pubs larger than 50 m^{2} had to be either be non-smoking or introduce separate smoking rooms. Below 50 m^{2} the owner could opt to make the establishment either a smoking or non-smoking place. The law provided for a long transition phase ending July 2010. The 2009 law was a subject of controversy, as the rules were widely ignored by bar owners and not actively enforced by the authorities. Anti-smoking campaigners claimed to have filed 18,000 reports with the authorities on non-compliant businesses since the bans were introduced, to little effect.

In December 2017, after a change in government – under the coalition of the centre-right ÖVP and the far-right FPÖ – an already passed bill banning smoking in all restaurants, bars, discos and pubs from May 2018 was repealed and the prior rules reinstated with some minor changes. In July 2019, after another change in government – under a technocratic government led by Chancellor Brigitte Bierlein – the parliament decided to reintroduce the strict ban for all types of restaurants, bars, discos, and pubs from 1 November 2019.

=== Bahrain ===
In 2008, the Bahrain government introduced anti-smoking laws indoor public areas, including restaurants, cafes, hair salons, shopping malls and public transport. The law was highlighted by the ban of smoking in private cars when there are children.

The law could be implemented in the following points:

1. Planting and manufacturing tobacco in Bahrain.
2. Cigarette vending machines.
3. Tobacco to be sold to anyone under the age of 18.
4. The importing of chewable-based tobacco products.
5. Smoking at closed public places, including airports, hotels, supermarkets and schools.
6. 'No smoking' signs must be displayed prominently where there is a ban.

=== Barbados ===
Barbados has a smoking ban in place in indoor public places, workplaces and public transport.

=== Belgium ===
- 1989: Smoking is prohibited in a list of public buildings (such as schools, hospitals, and stations).
- 2005: Companies should have implemented plans to discourage smoking.
- January 2006: Smoking prohibited in the workplace.
- January 2007: Smoking prohibited in restaurants and bars, except in those that serve "light meals" (e.g. cold meals, pizzas and warm meals that are served with bread instead of French fries) and have less of 30% of their sales from food servings. Small bars are also not included in the regulations. Larger bars, such as concert venues, should enforce the regulations although the initial experience was variable.
- September 2008: Smoking no longer allowed in schools.
- January 2010: A general smoking ban that included all types of bars had been discussed but was watered-down to a set of regulations that apply only when food is served.
- July 2011: On 15 March 2011, Belgium's Constitutional Court ruled that the discrimination between bars serving food and those not serving food (and casinos) distorted competition and that, as a consequence, the partial exemption had to end by July 2011, thus banning smoking in Belgian bars, restaurants and casinos without exception.

=== Benin ===
Benin has a smoking ban in place for certain public places.

=== Bermuda ===
As of 1 October 2006, smoking is banned in all enclosed workplaces in Bermuda, including restaurants, bars, private clubs and hotels.

=== Bhutan ===
Following a resolution of the 87th session of the National Assembly on 17 December 2004, a national prohibition upon the sale of tobacco and tobacco products went into effect, but importing limited tobacco has remained legal subject to very heavy taxes. Smoking in all public places in Bhutan became illegal on 22 February 2005. It thus became the first nation in the world to outlaw this practice outright.

The Tobacco Control Act of Bhutan was enacted by parliament on 16 June 2010. It prohibits the cultivation, harvesting, production, and sale of tobacco and tobacco products in Bhutan. The act also mandates that the government of Bhutan provide counseling and treatment to facilitate tobacco cessation. Premised on the physical health and well-being of the Bhutanese people – important elements of Gross National Happiness – the Tobacco Control Act recognizes the harmful effects of tobacco consumption and exposure to tobacco smoke on both spiritual and social health.

The consumption of tobacco is not altogether prohibited in Bhutan, though it is largely banned in places of public accommodation. The Act largely targets smoking in particular, though all forms of tobacco are subject to the Act. The Tobacco Control Act establishes non-smoking areas: commercial centers including markets, hotel lobbies, restaurants, and bars; recreation centers such as discothèques, cinemas, and playing fields; institutions and offices, both public and private; public gatherings and public spaces such as festivals, taxi stands, and the airport; all public transportation; and any other places declared by the Tobacco Control Board. The board also has the authority to designate smoking areas in public. Smoking areas are permitted in non-public areas of hotels (i.e. smoking floors or smoking rooms) at the discretion of the patron.

The Act allows individuals to import tobacco and tobacco products for personal consumption subject to limits set by the Tobacco Control Board, as well as duties and taxes. Those who bring their own tobacco or tobacco products into Bhutan must bear proof of taxation, may only bring goods that display required health warnings, and must not bring goods that promote tobacco by means that are false, misleading, or likely to create an erroneous impression of its characteristics, health effects, or hazards (e.g. descriptors such as "light" or "mild"). The Act totally prohibits tobacco advertisement, promotion and sponsorship, restricting the appearance of tobacco in domestic videos and movies to educational clips produced for the purpose of health promotion.

=== Bosnia and Herzegovina ===
The Federation of Bosnia and Herzegovina has prohibited smoking in public buildings nationwide since 1 September 2007. However, until 2016, indoor buildings were not completely smoke-free. Bosnia and Herzegovina was ranked the fourth highest in Europe by percentage of daily smokers in 2016, after Russia, Serbia and Greece (the highest). The Proposal of the Law on Control and Restricted Use of Tobacco, Tobacco Products and Other Smoking Products was accepted by a majority of votes in the House of Representatives of the FBiH Parliament. "For" voted 63, three were against, and two abstained. The bill now goes to the House of Peoples of the FBiH Parliament where it needs enough support to take effect. The law provides for a ban on smoking in all enclosed public spaces, public gatherings, workplaces and public transport, and private cars if there are minors in them. Article 5 of the proposed law clearly emphasizes the type of prohibition in question. This is the strictest law so far, which implies a complete ban on the consumption of tobacco and tobacco products in all enclosed public spaces, workplaces and public transport. Also, the consumption of tobacco in private vehicles with minors is prohibited. The exceptions are the consumption of chewing tobacco and snuff.

=== Brazil ===
Smoking in Brazil is forbidden in all enclosed public spaces except for specifically designated smoking areas. Since 15 December 2011, Federal Law 12546 (article 49) forbids smoking in enclosed spaces in the entire country, including restaurants and bars. As of 3 December 2014, Brazil has banned smoking in all indoor private and public places, including restaurants, bars and nightclubs. In 2017, a research was published in Brazil that the smoke-free laws implemented resulted in a reduction in the number of heart attacks welcomed in the hospitals. After a year and half, the number of deaths caused by heart attacks decreased by 12%.

=== Bulgaria ===
A comprehensive smoking ban has been introduced prohibiting smoking in all public places including bars, restaurants, clubs, workplaces, stadiums, etc. and came into effect on 1 June 2012, though smoking is allowed in restaurants as long as there are separate rooms for smokers and non-smokers.

=== Burkina Faso ===
Burkina Faso has a smoking ban in place. A decree from April 15, 2025 prohibits to consume any tobacco and vaping product in enclosed or open spaces ("such as parks, stadiums, and bus stops") and on public transport.

=== Burundi ===
Burundi has a smoking ban in public places, indoor work spaces and public transport per Law No. 1/012 of May 30, 20218 (code of the supply of health care and services) introduced several restrictions. As to Article 127, smoking is forbidden "in spaces used by the public, or to expose others to tobacco smoke" and article 128 clarifies that the ban applies also "in any places that are public, whether closed or open, in any workplaces, in any vehicle of public transportation and in any other place designated by the Minister of Public Health".

=== Cameroon ===
In Cameroon, smoking is only prohibited in schools, universities and ministry buildings. Since 2022, smoking of water-pipes (shisha) is forbidden.

=== Canada ===
In Canada, indoor smoking is restricted by all territories and provinces and by the Canadian federal government. As of 2010, smoking bans within each of these jurisdictions are mostly consistent, despite the separate development of legislation by each. The federal government's workplace smoking ban applies only to the federal government and to federally regulated businesses, such as airports. In Ontario and Alberta, smoking is banned in all workplaces except designated areas. Smoking rooms are available in select hotels and motels in most jurisdictions. Individual communities have bylaws restricting where individuals may smoke. In several Canadian cities smoking has now been banned on municipally owned property including public parks. Manitoba, Nova Scotia, New Brunswick, Newfoundland and Labrador, Alberta, Ontario and Québec have also prohibited smoking within vehicles with children under 16.

=== Chad ===
In Chad, the consumption of tobacco is prohibited in all public places, indoor workplaces and public transport. Smoking is also forbidden in private vehicles with a pregnant woman or a minor inside it; in out-buildings, courtyards, terraces and other contiguous places, where the smoke can reach the indoor areas for the nature of the building; in tents, hangars, marquees and other similar structures, that are open to the public.

=== Chile ===
Chile prohibits smoking in schools, hospitals, government offices, shopping centres, supermarkets, pharmacies, airports, buses, subway networks and other indoor public places. Smoking indoors in universities is restricted, although it is allowed outdoors. In 2013 Chile's legislative body approved a ban on all smoking in public enclosed spaces nationwide, including restaurants, pubs and clubs.

=== China (People's Republic of China) ===
==== Mainland China ====
Shanghai Municipality expanded a smoking ban from hospitals to kindergartens, schools, libraries and stadiums, as of 1 March 2010, and had attempted to restrict smoking in restaurants for the 2010 World Expo, but compliance in restaurants was reportedly poor and enforcement lax. In 2015, Shanghai municipality improved the smoking ban by adding hotels, offices and restaurants. As of March 2017, Shanghai widened its smoking ban by implementing on all public places and adding some outdoor areas In Guangdong Province, the municipalities of Guangzhou and Jiangmen restricted smoking in public places in 2007, but the law was not effectively enforced.

A new national smoking ban, which extends to all enclosed public areas, came into effect on 1 May 2011. However enforcement of this is patchy at the best of times, especially outside developed cities like Beijing.

On 1 June 2015, Beijing enacted a new law banning smoking in public spaces such as restaurants and bars, offices, shopping malls, on public transportation and at airports. Those breaking the law will be fined 200 yuan ($32) and will be "named and shamed" on a government website after three times. Businesses allowing patrons to light up could be fined up to 10,000 yuan ($1,600) and could have their licenses revoked for repeat offences.

==== Hong Kong ====
Hong Kong has seen all public smoking restricted from 1 January 2007 under the government's revised Smoking (Public Health) Ordinance (Cap. 371), first enacted in 1982 with several amendments subsequently. The latest amendment enlarges the smoke-free regulations to include indoor workplaces, most public places including restaurants, Internet cafés, public lavatories, beaches and most public parks. Some bars, karaoke parlors, saunas and nightclubs were exempt until 1 July 2009. Smoke-free regulations pertaining to lifts, public transport, cinemas, concert halls, airport terminals and escalators had been phased in between 1982 and 1997. The smoke-free requirements in shopping centres, department stores, supermarkets, banks, game arcades have been in place since July 1998.

An anomaly exists on cross-border trains between Hong Kong and mainland China as they are operated jointly between MTR Corporation and China Railways, of whom the latter allows smoking in the restaurant car and in the vestibules at the end of the cars, but not in the seating area.

Any person who smokes or carries a lighted tobacco product in a statutory no smoking area commits an offence and is liable on summary conviction to a maximum fine of HK$5,000. Unlike many other jurisdictions, Hong Kong does not place the onus on licensees of liquor licensed premises to enforce smoke-free regulations bans with subsequent loss of licence for non-compliance. A 2009 law provides for fixed-penalty arrangement (HK$1,500) for smoking, on a par with that for littering. At the same time smoking was to be prohibited in designated public transport interchanges, but the government has yet to clarify how it will enforce this against non-Hong Kong ID card-holders and tourists, since the offender has 21 days after the ticket issue to pay up.

==== Macau ====
In Macau, smoking is prohibited in a number of places as per Law No. 5/2011.

=== Colombia ===
In 2009, Colombia extended its existing tobacco control regulations by requiring all indoor workplaces and public places be immediately smoke-free.

=== Comoros ===
Comoros has a smoking ban in place for certain public places.

=== Costa Rica ===
In 2012, Costa Rica passed one of the strictest smoking regulations in the whole world. This legislation has banned smoking in buses, taxis, trains and their terminals, work places (including parking lots), public buildings, restaurants, bars, casinos, and all enclosed public-access buildings, granting no exceptions (no separate "smoking areas" are permitted). It also bans smoking in outdoor recreational or educational areas such as parks, stadia and university campuses.

=== Croatia ===
On 22 November 2008 the Croatian Parliament passed legislation prohibiting smoking in public institutions such as hospitals, clinics, schools, nurseries and universities with infractions punishable with up to 1000 kuna (140 euros). A notable exception in the Act are psychiatric wards in Croatia's hospitals. The law went further in May 2009 when smoking was banned in all enclosed public areas including bars, restaurants and cafes. The smoking ban applies to all public areas where non-smokers could suffer from second-hand smoke including open public areas like sport stadiums, arenas, open-air theatres, tram and bus stations etc. On 10 September 2009 the regulations restricting smoking in bars and cafes in Croatia was partially repealed for a grace period until 9 April 2010, local media has reported. Proprietors with establishments that are up to 50 sq m that meet very strict conditions will now be able to choose whether to allow smoking. One of the conditions is a ventilation system that is able to change indoor air at least 10 times per hour. By March 2010 only 16 (out of 16,000) establishments in all of Croatia had met the conditions and been permitted to allow smoking. Larger establishments will have to include a designated and separately ventilated smoking area.

=== Cuba ===
Cuba has prohibited smoking in most workplaces since February 2005. The ban included prohibiting smoking in closed public spaces, public transport, educational, health and sporting institutions. However, the ban was not very effective as a study revealed that more than 50% of the population are being exposed to smoking in daily life.

=== Cyprus ===
On 9 July 2009 Cyprus passed a new law, tightening up ineffective 2002 legislation, which banned smoking in bars, restaurants, nightclubs and workplaces as of 1 January 2010. Since the implementation of the smoking ban on 1 January 2010, compliance levels have been variable, apparently mainly due to a lack of enforcement by the police. A spokesman for some restaurant & bar owners has nevertheless complained that the introduction of the ban has led to a drop in revenue.

=== Czech Republic ===
The second German anti-tobacco organisation, the Bund Deutscher Tabakgegner (Federation of German Tobacco Opponents), was established in 1910 in Trautenau, Bohemia. In 1920, a Bund Deutscher Tabakgegner in der Tschechoslowakei (Federation of German Tobacco Opponents in Czechoslovakia) was formed in Prague, after Czechoslovakia was separated from the Austro-Hungarian Empire at the end of World War I. Currently, there is a law in force that restricts smoking in some public places such as institutions, hospitals, bus stops and other public service stops, in May 2017 restriction expanded to prohibit smoking in restaurants, bars and clubs. In June 2009, the parliament approved a bill ostensibly regulating smoking in public places. However, at the time this regulation only required bars and restaurants to post a sign saying whether smoking was allowed or not, or whether there are separate rooms for smokers and non-smokers in the establishment. In February 2011, the popular initiative "stop kouření" announced, that 115,000 people had signed their petition demanding a ban on smoking in restaurants and denouncing the country's high cancer rate, poor rating concerning tobacco control and possible corruption of members of the Czech Parliament. On 9 December 2016, the Chamber of Deputies passed a law that bans smoking in all restaurants and bars. The bill was approved by the Senate on 19 January 2017, and signed by the President Miloš Zeman on 14 February 2017. It came into effect on 31 May 2017.

=== Democratic Republic of the Congo ===
The Democratic Republic of the Congo has a smoking ban in place for certain public places.

=== Denmark ===
Since 15 August 2007, smoking in hospitality facilities, restaurants, bars, clubs, public transport, and all private and public workplaces has been forbidden. Exemptions to the law are bars with a floor space of less than 40 m^{2}. Separate smoking rooms are allowed in hospitality facilities as long as no food or beverage is served there. The law's initially controversial reception was accompanied by variable enforcement. As of 1 July 2014, smoking is prohibited in train stations including the platforms (whether inside or out), it is however poorly enforced, and smoking is seen on both inside and outside platforms regularly. In the municipality of Randers, politicians are preparing to implement outdoor anti-smoking recommendations, which will advise people not to smoke and without any fines applied.

In 2018 the municipality of Copenhagen introduced "smoke-free school time" in all of their schools, meaning that it became forbidden for all students in pre-highschool to smoke during schoolhours, both inside and outside the school site. From 1 January 2021 the concept was introduced to all pre-highschools and youthcentres in Denmark. From 31 July 2021, the law would include all schools having students under 18 years old, meaning that students of e.g. high schools are not allowed to smoke before the school day ending no matter their location.

==== Greenland ====
Since 2010 there has been a smoking ban in hospitality facilities, restaurants, bars, clubs, public transport, and all private and public workplaces.

=== Djibouti ===
Djibouti has a smoking ban in place for certain public places.

=== Ecuador ===
Smoking is common in bars and dance clubs, but non-smoking signs in restaurants in Quito are generally respected. A national law has forbidden smoking in bars. A bill was passed in 2006 that prohibits smoking in indoor workplaces, public transportation and public places. In 2011, Ecuador Parliament implemented a new tobacco control, that witnessed the addition of smoking ban in sport facilities and on all health or educational institutions.

=== El Salvador ===
El Salvador has a smoking ban in indoor workplaces and public places.

=== Eritrea ===
Eritrea has a smoking ban in public places, indoor workspaces and public transport. There is an exception for bars.

=== Estonia ===
Smoking has been restricted in indoor public areas and workplaces since 4 June 2005, except in restaurants. Subsequently, a ban on smoking in bars, restaurants, coffee shops and nightclubs started on 5 June 2007 (although smoking is still allowed in isolated smoking rooms). Water pipe and cigar smoking is allowed in special clubs with a license.

Smoking was banned in all prisons on 1 October 2017.

=== Ethiopia ===
Ethiopia's 2019 law bans smoking in all indoor workplaces and on public transport.

=== Falkland Islands ===
Smoking has been prohibited in all enclosed public places (including pubs, restaurants, social clubs, hotels and shops), enclosed workplaces, and public vehicles (taxis and buses) since 1 February 2011.

=== Faroe Islands ===
As of 1 July 2008, smoking ban applied on all public and private workplaces. The ban also included public areas and transport.

=== Fiji ===
Fiji has a smoking ban in public places, indoor workspaces and public transport. Designated smoking rooms are allowed in bars, pubs, and nightclubs, airport terminals, and private offices.

=== Finland ===
Smoking has been restricted in indoor public areas and workplaces from 1 March 1995, and permitted only in specially designated smoking rooms; restaurants were included in 2007. Legislation aimed towards voluntary reduction of second-hand smoke was enacted, but was not successful; few establishments installed effective ventilation systems. Dividing a restaurant into a smoking and non-smoking section was also an ineffective measure. As a result, smoking has since been prohibited in all indoor public and workplaces, including bars, cafes, clubs and restaurants, from 1 June 2007, except in some places permitted a transition period of up to two years. Smoking was permitted in trains in designated smoking booths until June 2013, when it was banned by the national railway company. Smoking in bars is still allowed in enclosed smoking booths, where it is not permitted to serve or consume food or drink. Many smaller bars have not been able to build such smoking booths and patrons must smoke outside.

As of early 2010, Finland's government has openly considered planning gradual moves towards prohibiting smoking completely.

=== France ===
Smoking is banned in all indoor public places (stations, museums, restaurants, cafés, etc.) Establishments with the sign "Tabac" come within the same strict regulations. This sign only means that they are state-licensed to sell tobacco products. As of 1 July 2025, France extended its smoking ban to include beaches, parks and public gardens, bus shelters, sports venues, and areas near schools. Anyone caught in violation of these bans are subject to a €135 fine.

=== Gabon ===
In Gabon, smoking is prohibited in many public places but the law requires designated smoking areas to be provided.

=== Gambia ===
The Gambia has a smoking ban in place.

=== Georgia ===
On 1 May 2018 legislation banning smoking in public places (stations, hotels, restaurants, café-bars, etc.) was enacted.

=== Germany ===
The 16 states of Germany have their own smoking laws. As of July 2016, nearly 40% of the German population (Bavaria, North Rhine-Westphalia, Saarland) live in a state with a strict smoking ban including all restaurants, pubs, cafés and discos. In the other 13 states designated smoking rooms as well as one-room smoking bars with less than 75 m^{2} are permitted.

=== Gibraltar ===
Smoking has been prohibited in all enclosed public spaces since 1 October 2012. This includes also public transportation, offices and work environments. In 2021 the "Smoking Prohibition (Playgrounds and Parks) Regulations" (LN.2021/182) extends the ban to public parks, playgrounds, schools, beaches and public recreational areas. It is also forbidden to smoke in the outdoor premises of healthcare facilities.

=== Greece ===
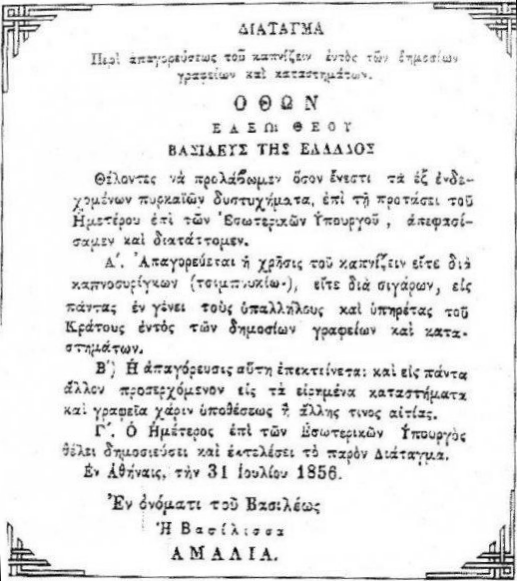
Royal decree of 1856, introducing the first restriction upon smoking in modern Greece. Prohibition was valid only within state buildings and was grounded on the need to prevent accidents.

Effective from 1 September 2010, that law prohibited smoking and consumption of tobacco products by other means, in all workplaces, transport stations, taxis and passenger ships (in trains, buses and aeroplanes smoking had already been prohibited), as well as in all enclosed public places including restaurants, nightclubs, etc., without any exception. However, enforcement of that law was weak, with most owners of coffee shops, pubs, and restaurants continuing to permit smoking.
Finally, in October 2019, the law was further amended to expressly include a ban on all "equivalent" products, such as vaping devices, e-cigarettes and other inhaled products in the aforementioned enclosed spaces plus large-surface nightclubs, which were previously exempted, and sheltered outdoor spaces of bars and restaurants that are not exposed at least on two sides. Moreover, the law was reinforced with provisions rendering the police authorities responsible for the enforcement of the ban, with stricter fines for customers and businesses alike, including temporary and permanent shutdowns of businesses in cases of subsequent violations, with a helpline for complaints (initially by phone, now online) and with anti-smoking campaigns that assisted people to quit smoking. As a result, there has been a tremendous decrease in passive smoking in Greece, with only few certain private establishments notoriously attempting to ignore the law and risk fines, as well as a trend towards quitting or cutting down on smoking. A new amendment to the current law is envisaged to more accurately describe those sheltered outdoor areas of bars and restaurants that will be obliged to prohibit smoking (e.g. spaces protected with plastic sheeting, canopies and barriers) and to include chewing tobacco products.

=== Guinea ===
Guinea has a smoking ban in place for certain public places.

=== Guatemala ===
Guatemala has implemented a comprehensive smoking ban covering all types of places and institutions. In December 2008 the Guatemalan Congress approved Decree 74-2008 and it became effective in February 2009. This law restricts smoking in all work-places including health-care facilities, governmental facilities, schools, universities, airports, bars and restaurants. However, two years after the law's implementation enforcement has been deficient. Governments are facing pressures to permit work-place smoking once more by local tobacco companies.

=== Guernsey ===
Smoke-free ordinances were introduced at different times in the Bailiwick of Guernsey, a British Crown dependency. Smoking was restricted in all enclosed public places in the island of Guernsey, including workplaces, bars, clubs and restaurants, on 2 July 2006, under the "Smoking (Prohibition in Public Places and Workplaces) (Guernsey) Law 2005". Anyone who breaks the law, upon conviction, could be fined up to the maximum of £1000 (~€1150, ~$1470). Smoking is allowed anywhere outside and in whatever company.

In Alderney, the States of Alderney passed a smoke-free law with the President's casting vote on 13 January 2010; the legislation came into force at 4 am on 1 June 2010.

Smoking in indoor public places continues to be permitted in Sark, except in pubs and restaurants.

=== Guyana ===
Guyana has a smoking ban in public places, indoor work spaces and public transport. The laws are very rarely enforced and smoking inside of local village bars and even in the capital city, Georgetown, nightclubs is very common. Offenders could face a 10,000.00 GYD fine if they are caught.

=== Honduras ===
Honduras strictly banned smoking in all indoors places in February 2011. It carries fines of $311 per incident, with police involvement, and fines up to $6,000 for businesses with possibility of being forced to close, and has been strongly enforced, even in provincial areas, including in large bars and nightclubs. Billiards areas at night continue to allow smokers.

=== Hungary ===
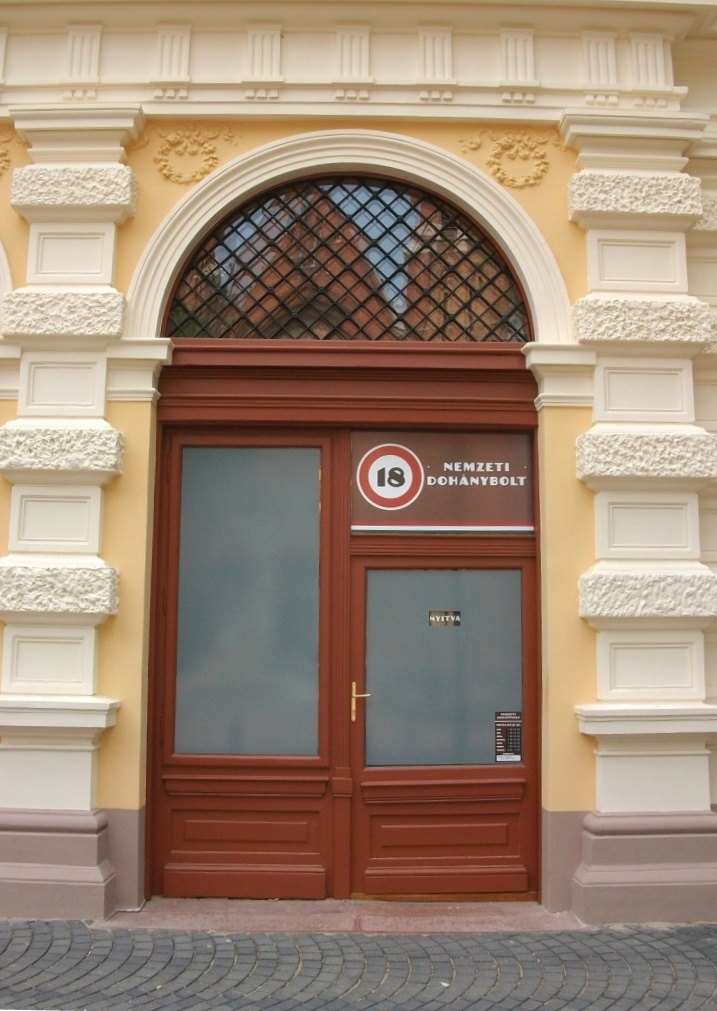
Nemzeti Dohánybolt (National Tobacco Shop) in Békéscsaba. These state-controlled shops have the same design and regulation all over Hungary.

Smoking has been restricted for several years on public transport, in hospitals and airports and in public and national buildings; including the Parliament. From 2010, a smoke-free policy has been in effect in playgrounds and underpasses. Several cities, including Budapest, have prohibited smoking at public transport stops. Following a decade of resistance by the tobacco lobby, a comprehensive nationwide smoke-free law covering all indoors public spaces (including workplaces, clubs, pubs, restaurants) came into effect from January 2012. In March 2017, Hungary was one of only seven EU member states that have a complete ban on smoking in all enclosed public places.

=== Iceland ===
Smoking and the use of other tobacco products are prohibited in most public spaces in Iceland. This includes all enclosed spaces in common ownership, all public land intended for use by children, all public transport and all services; including restaurants, bars, clubs and cafés.

=== India ===
A nationwide smoke-free law pertaining to public places came into effect from 2 October 2008. Places where smoking is restricted include auditoriums, movie theatres, hospitals, public transport (aircraft, buses, trains, metros, monorails, taxis, autos) and their related facilities (airports, bus stands/stations, railway stations), restaurants, hotels, bars, pubs, amusement centres, offices (government and private), libraries, courts, post offices, markets, shopping malls, canteens, refreshment rooms, banquet halls, discothèques, coffee houses, educational institutions and parks. Smoking is allowed on roads, inside one's home or vehicle. Smoking is also permitted in airports, restaurants, bars, pubs, discothèques and some other enclosed workplaces if they provide designated separate smoking areas. Anybody violating this law will be charged with a fine of ₹200.

=== Indonesia ===
In Jakarta's restaurants, hotels, office buildings, airports and public transport, and overall public areas smoking is not permitted. Restaurants wanting to allow smoking must provide a separate smoking space, as of 4 February 2006. As in some other Asian nations, it remains to be seen whether it can be enforced. Building separate facilities for smokers had only taken place in half of establishments by June 2007.

Smoke-free regulations were extended to Bali in November 2011, affecting tourist sites, including restaurants and hotels; plus schools, government buildings, places of worship and other public places.

Smoking in trains of state company PT Kereta Api Indonesia has been banned as of 1 March 2012.

Bali has banned smoking to be effective 1 June 2012, also having heavy fines. Hotels, restaurants, tourist attractions, places of worship, healthcare facilities and schools are to be smoke-free areas. Smoking and advertising for tobacco products have also been banned in playgrounds, traditional and modern markets, transportation terminals, airports, government offices and on public transportation.

=== Iran ===
Smoking in Iran has been banned in all public places since 2007. This includes all state bodies, hotels, restaurants. The law also bans the smoking of traditional waterpipes (ghalyun) which were common in Iranian tea houses. A smoking ban for all car drivers nationwide was implemented in March 2006, and although offenders can face fines, the ban has been widely ignored.

=== Ireland ===
Ireland became the first country in the world to institute a nationwide comprehensive smoke-free workplaces law on 29 March 2004. Prior to this, comprehensive smoke-free law was instituted, smoking had already been outlawed (1988) in public buildings, hospitals, pharmacies, schools, banking halls, cinemas, public hairdressing premises, restaurant kitchens, part of all restaurants, on public aircraft and buses, and some trains (Intercity trains provided smokers' carriages).

=== Isle of Man ===
The Isle of Man's smoke-free law is similar to the one introduced in England, and came into effect on 30 March 2008. This also included Europe's first fully smoke-free prison.

=== Israel ===
In Israel, smoking is prohibited in public enclosed places or commercial areas via several laws: particularly, since 1983, the "Israel Clean Air Act" (חוק אוויר נקי לישראל (in Hebrew)). The law was amended in 2007 so that owners are held accountable for smoking in premises under their responsibility. The second means by which smoking is regulated in Israel is via the environmental hazard law, and via criminal law smoking (or the introduction of second-hand smoke) may even be considered an assault.

The restrictions include all commercial entities such as lavatories, office buildings, gyms, cafés, restaurants, discos, pubs and bars, and it is illegal for the owners of such places to put ashtrays anywhere inside enclosed spaces. Also, owners of public places must display "no smoking" signs and prevent visitors from smoking. They can also designate a well-ventilated and completely separate area for smokers, as long as the non-smokers' area does not fall below 75% of the whole area. The fine for owners of public places is ₪ 5,000 (around US$1400) and for smokers – ₪ 1000. In spite of all of this, the smoke-free law has not met with 100% compliance and smoking is still encountered in some pubs, bars and clubs. In Israel, a 2011 law restricts smoking in railway stations and at bus stops, and prohibits the sale of tobacco from automated vending machines. An individual may call the police in cases of smoking in a restricted environment and can also sue (via the citizen's court) the smoking entity (i.e., both the person smoking and the facility that allowed smoking to occur).

Some cities are known for their rigorous enforcement of the smoke-free laws, such as the city of Be'er Sheva (which raised revenue of 799,000 NIS (≈215K USD) in 2011 through fining smoking in public places) and Tel-Aviv, but in many municipalities the law isn't enforced.

=== Italy ===
Since 2003 it is forbidden to smoke in all public indoor spaces, including bars, cafés, restaurants and discos. However, special smoking rooms are allowed. In such areas food can be served, but they are subjected to very strict conditions: they need to be separately ventilated, with high air replacement rates; their air pressure must constantly be lower than the pressure in the surrounding rooms; they must be equipped with automatic sliding doors to prevent smoke from spreading to tobacco-free areas; they may occupy at most 50% of the establishment. Only 1% of all public establishments have opted for setting up a smoking room. Smoking is also forbidden in all enclosed workplaces – this includes also trains and underground stations. It is, indeed, permitted to smoke outdoors, which means that since Italy has sunny weather more than half of the year, people can still smoke at restaurants and bars as long as they sit at the outside tables and the establishment permits it.

=== Ivory Coast ===
Ivory Coast has a smoking ban in place.

=== Jamaica ===
Smoking is not permitted in the airport or generally indoors at shops and malls and places of business. However smoking is usually permitted in bars, discos and other licensed premises that serve alcohol indoors, but not in restaurants or casinos. Smoking is often permitted in tourist resorts in places that would be typically considered indoors in North America (roof but no walls), but this does not apply to indoor air-conditioned places. Jamaica has no national smoke-free law, but most places have a no-smoking sign if smoking is not permitted and it is open-air with a roof. Most places that permit smoking indoors will have ashtrays on the table to signify that it is permitted. However, if there is a sandbox at the entrance of a building then it usually signals that the place does not permit indoor smoking.

Effective 15 July 2013, Jamaica's Health Minister banned smoking in all covered public places on the island.

=== Japan ===
Although there are no nationwide smoke-free regulations in Japan, and efforts to introduce such reforms are strongly opposed by powerful lobby groups, there is a growing number of local ordinances restricting smoking. In Tokyo's Chiyoda, Shinagawa, Shinjuku and Nakano wards, smoking is banned on the streets for reasons of child safety (not health). Smoking is prohibited on public transport and subway platforms, although smoking areas are usually provided on above-ground platforms. Unlike Tokyo's municipal governments, which can fine people for smoking on the streets, public transport companies don't have the authority to enforce smoking bans. Because of this inability, there are smokers who flout the smoking ban, in some cases very frequently, such as at Minami-Urawa Station in Saitama Prefecture, which borders Tokyo. Kanagawa Prefecture introduced the country's first prefecture-wide smoking ban in April 2010, banning smoking in public places such as hospitals, schools and government offices. The ordinance requires large restaurants and hotels to choose whether to become non-smoking or create separate smoking areas, while mahjong and pachinko parlours, restaurants with a floor area of up to 100 square metres and hotels with a floor area of up to 700 square metres are only required to "make efforts" to reduce secondhand smoke. Another Kanagawa regulation restricting smoking on beaches was implemented in May 2010. Although still relatively few, a growing number of private companies are voluntarily implementing smoking bans in restaurants, taxis, buildings and bars.

In 2017, Japan was urged by the International Olympic Committee (IOC) to implement smoking bans in all public areas to create a healthy sporting environment. As the host of the 2020 Summer Olympics, Japan was in danger of becoming the unhealthiest country to host the Olympics in years. Due to the COVID-19 pandemic, the event was postponed to the following year.

=== Jersey ===
Smoking is restricted in public places in Jersey (a British Crown dependency).

The Restriction on Smoking (Jersey) Law 1973 enabled the States of Jersey to pass regulations prohibiting or restricting smoking in places of entertainment and public transport. In pursuance of this law, smoking was banned on public transport by the Smoking (Public Transport) (Jersey) Regulations 1982.

The Restriction on Smoking (Jersey) Law 1973 was amended by the Restriction on Smoking (Amendment No. 2) (Jersey) Law 2006 adopted 16 May 2006 that enabled the States to make regulations that prohibit or restrict smoking tobacco or a substance (or a mixture of substances) other than tobacco, or the use of tobacco, in a workplace or other defined places.

=== Jordan ===
Smoking is banned in hospitals, health centers, schools, cinemas, theaters, public libraries, museums, governmental and non-governmental public premises, means of transportation, arrivals and departures halls at airports, enclosed stadiums and lecture-halls. On 14 April 2015, three coffee shops closed for violating smoking ban laws and their owners went to court.

=== Kazakhstan ===
Kazakhstan partially restricted smoking in public places on 1 April 2003. A comprehensive smoke-free law was instituted in September 2009. Enforcing the smoke-free law appears to be somewhat problematic as far as public bus services are concerned. While smoking by passengers on the public bus services was never an issue, bus operators on duty were being consistently reported as smoking inside the bus vehicles and persistently ignoring requests by the passengers not to do so.

=== Kenya ===
Smoking in public indoor areas has been restricted in Nairobi, Kenya since July 2007, with small private bars exempt. A similar smoke-free ordinance was already in effect in Mombasa.

=== Kuwait ===
Kuwait has outlawed smoking indoors in public places as of 2012, including restaurants, cafes and hotels, but exempting shisha parlours. In 2015, Kuwait's General Traffic Department considered banning smoking when driving, which is considered the major cause of accidents in Kuwait. In February 2016, smoking in malls was banned and fine of 50KD for the first time and 100 KD for the second time getting caught. While the owner of restaurants and cafes inside the malls could face a fine of 5000KD if someone is caught smoking inside their facilities.

=== Latvia ===
As of 1 May 2010, smoking has been completely outlawed in restaurants and bars. Previously non-smoking areas had to be larger than half of the total area of the establishment. In addition, more than half of the summer terraces of bars and restaurants are required to be smoke-free. Smoking is also restricted in parks and for ten metres around entrances of public buildings as well as public transportation stops. Smoking on public transportation, except for ferries, is also forbidden.

In late 2011 some municipalities, for example, Ozolnieku novads, prohibited smoking on balconies and by open windows in apartment blocks and others multi-storey buildings.

In late 2014 amendments to the law considering smoking ban took effect and included whole areas surrounding educational institutions, apartment building balconies, entrances and staircases as prohibited areas where smoking is not allowed. Also additions to law states that every person, located in the vicinity of the smoker, now are given rights to ask the smoker to extinguish the cigarette at once upon request. Smoking in vicinity of underage children is now classified as child abuse, and punished respectively.

=== Liechtenstein ===
There have been several smoking bans put into place. These include the restriction of smoking in government buildings, places of employment, and all forms of public transportation. In March 2009, Liechtenstein held a public vote to ban smoking in restaurants. However, the ban was strongly opposed with over 80% of the voters opposing the ban.

=== Lithuania ===
Smoking has been restricted in restaurants, bars, places where food is served, clubs (except for special cigar and pipe clubs), and nightclubs since 1 January 2007. Furthermore, smoking on public transportation is forbidden (except on long-distance trains with special facilities), and workplaces inside a building (except designated places). It is also illegal to smoke inside public halls where non-smoking people might have to breathe tobacco fumes. The law is well respected (at least in the largest cities) but smoking in hallways and staircases is still common.

=== Lebanon ===
As of 3 September 2012, smoking has been prohibited in enclosed public places such as restaurants, cafes, and hotel. Anybody violating this ban will be charged with a fine of over $100, and the restaurant, the cafe or the hotel will be charged with a fine between $1300 and $4000

=== Liberia ===
Liberia has a smoking ban for public indoor places, indoor workplaces and public transport.

=== Luxembourg ===
Smoking is prohibited in all indoor public places, like hospitals, shopping centres, schools and restaurants. However, cafés and bars that only serve snacks are exempt. There is a smoking prohibition from 12 noon to 14:00h and 19:00h to 21:00h in cafés where meals are served. From 1 January 2014, the smoking ban will also cover all cafés and bars, except in specially ventilated smoking rooms. As of 13 August 2017, smoking is prohibited in playgrounds, sporting venues in which under 16s will be playing and private vehicles in which under 12s are present. The law was also changed to prohibit under 18s from purchasing tobacco and to treat e-cigarettes in the same fashion as tobacco.

=== Madagascar ===
By official law, smoking is prohibited in taxi-brousses, but this is not enforced. The only transport environments in which smoking is prohibited are Antananarivo International Airport and on Air Madagascar flights. It is also forbidden to smoke in pubs and clubs.

=== Malawi ===
No smoke-free ordinance is in place, nor is one planned (December 2012)

=== Malaysia ===
In all, 23 areas are smoke-free, including hospitals/clinics, airports, public lifts and toilets, restaurants, public transport, government premises, educational institutions, petrol stations, Internet cafes, shopping complexes and private office spaces with central air-conditioning, R&R area, public parks and areas of national parks. However, enforcement is lax, and the government claims to have plans to get tougher on offenders.

Starting 1 June 2010, it is an offence to smoke at private office spaces with central air-conditioning. People who violate the rules can be fined up to RM10,000 (US$3,333), or two years of imprisonment.

Since 1 January 2019, Smoking is prohibited in all types of restaurant within 3 meters from building or outer most table and fully enforcement by health authorities on 1 January 2020 which risk being fined more than RM 250 for offenders.

=== Maldives ===
Effective 1 November 2025, the Maldives enacted a generational smoking ban prohibiting the purchase, sale and use of tobacco to those born on or after 1 January 2007. This new ban applies to both residents and tourists.

=== Malta ===
In April 2004, smoking was restricted in all enclosed public spaces, including public transportation, clubs and restaurants, although smoking areas are allowed. While technically illegal, the reality regarding clubs is that smoking is permitted anywhere inside (despite No-Smoking signage), with little to no enforcement.

=== Mauritius ===
Since 1 March 2009, smoking is completely prohibited in all public places, workplaces and inside vehicles if they are carrying people other than the driver.

=== Mexico ===
Smoking in hospitals and airports has been restricted for at least 15 years. Smoking is allowed in designated areas at the Cancun Airport, although there are no longer any smoking areas within the international terminal. Mexico City's current smoking policy, passed in April 2004, requires physically separate smoking and non-smoking areas, and for non-smoking areas to make up at least 30% of all space in restaurants and bars. A proposal debated early in 2007 to extend Mexico City's smoking policy to provide completely smoke-free restaurants, bars, schools, taxis, and buses, did not pass. It was proposed again in the middle of 2007.

Since April 2008 the law has covered Mexico City, and since 28 August 2008 the law has been extended nationwide, although now some restaurants and other public places have the same designated areas for smokers as those that existed before the introduction of the law. Some bars and clubs continue to tolerate illegal indoor smoking at night, regardless of the law.

=== Monaco ===
There has been a smoke-free law pertaining to public indoor places in Monaco since 1 November 2008, including bars, restaurants and nightclubs.

=== Montenegro ===
Smoking in public places is prohibited in Montenegro, unless a smoking permit is obtained from the government. Most cafes and bars in Montenegro continue to permit smoking on the premises, although several organizations are putting pressure on more local businesses to forbid smoking indoors.

=== Morocco ===
Morocco's House of Representatives unanimously passed a smoke-free law pertaining to public places on 26 June 1995 (Dahir n° 1-91-112 law n° 15–91).

=== Mozambique ===
Since 2007, smoking has been restricted in indoor public places including public transport, government buildings, schools, hospitals, libraries, cinemas, theatres, restaurants and bars, with the exception of specially designated smoking rooms.

=== Myanmar ===
Myanmar has a smoking ban in place for certain public places.

=== Namibia ===
On 8 October 2009, the Namibian National Assembly adopted the Tobacco Products Control Bill, potentially one of the most comprehensive smoke-free ordinances. The law (once implemented) will prohibit "the smoking of tobacco in a public place, any outdoor public place or any area within a certain distance of a window, ventilation inlet, door or entrance". The bill was voted into law on 16 February 2010, became effective on 1 April 2014, and a public ban on smoking was in effect by 1 July 2014.

=== Nepal ===
Nepal Government implemented a smoke-free law covering public places, effective from 7 August 2011. The Tobacco (Control and Regulatory) Act restricts smoking in airports, hotels, restaurants, government offices and other public places.

The Tobacco Control and Regulation Act-2068 was signed by President Dr. Ram Baran Yadav on 29 April.

The Act includes provisions for officials to inspect implementation of the new law. A fine of Rs 100-100,000 will be slapped on anyone who smokes in public places or sells tobacco products to people below 18 or to pregnant women.

=== Netherlands ===
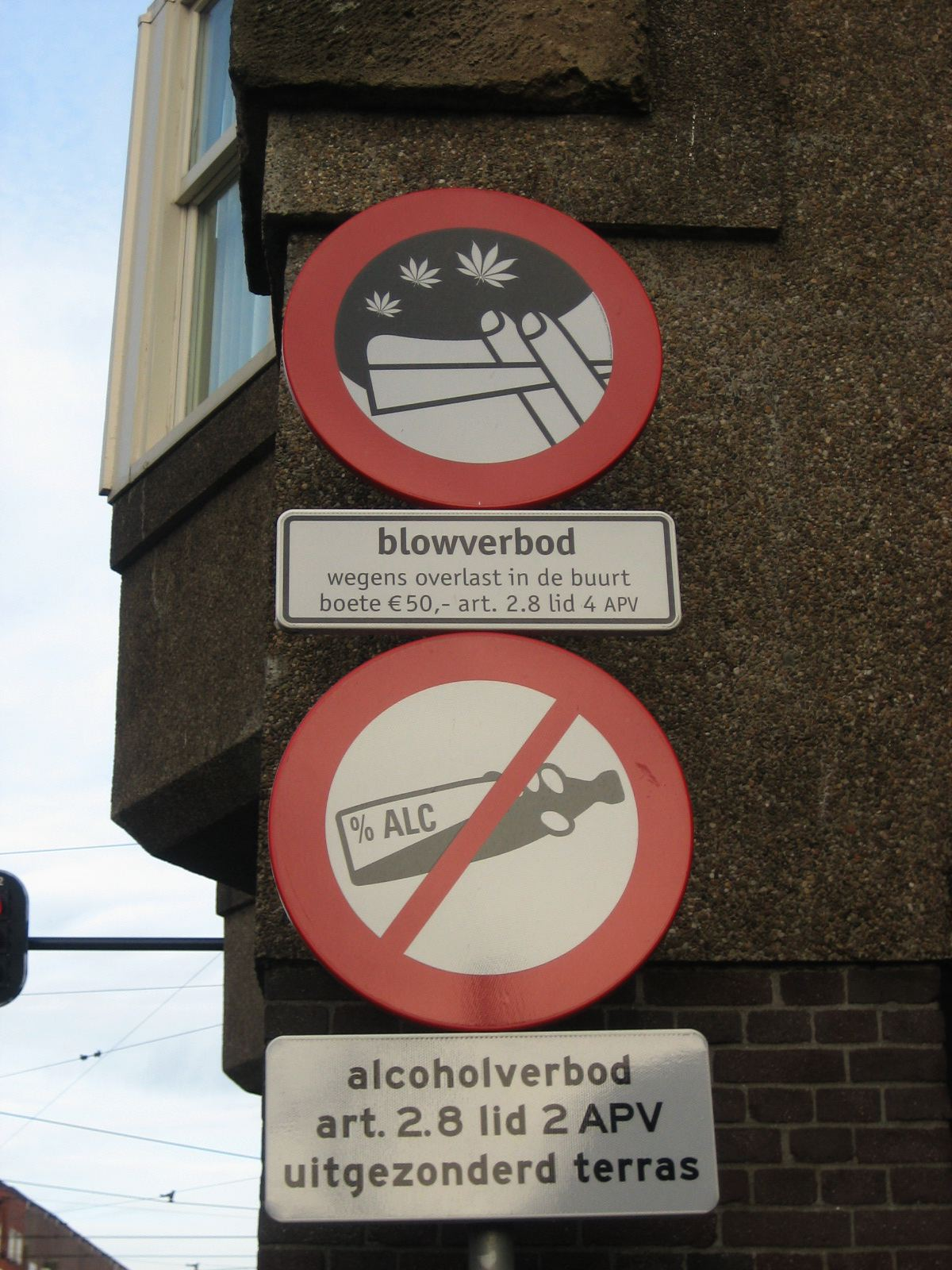
Two street signs in Amsterdam prohibiting the public consumption of cannabis and alcohol

The smoking of tobacco is prohibited by law in all public buildings and on public transport. On railway platforms, the limited smoking areas are not enforced. As of 1 January 2004, every employee has the right to work in a smoke-free environment. Tobacco legislation states that employers are obliged to take measures to ensure that employees are able to carry out their work without being bothered or affected by secondhand smoke from other people. On 1 January 2008, Amsterdam Airport Schiphol became the first completely smoke-free European airport; however, since August 2008; smoking has been permitted in designated smoking rooms. Since 1 July 2008, the smoke-free law has also applied to all hotels, restaurants, bars and cafes in the Netherlands. Separate smoking rooms are allowed in hospitality facilities as long as no food or beverage is served there, although the court banned them as of February 2018. Smoking of cannabis (including hashish) in coffeeshops is permitted as long as it is not mixed with tobacco. In 2010, the new government spoke out against the effects of the smoke-free law upon small catering businesses. The law was widely ignored with statistics showing that around 41% of bars and discos had flouted it. On 3 November 2010, the new government lifted the smoke-free regulations for bars of 70 square metres or less, on the condition that the bar did not employ any staff other than the owner. Around 3,000 of the 5,500 bars in the Netherlands are staffed by the owner alone.

On 12 February 2013, the Dutch lower house agreed on a total ban in the hospitality sector with 77–73, with no exception for smaller, owner-operated bars. Special smoking rooms without service were not affected by the change in the law.

Since 1 January 2017, smoking rooms are no longer to be allowed in city hall and other municipal buildings of Amsterdam and within a 20-meter distance of these buildings.

On 13 February 2018, the court in The Hague decided that smoking rooms are no longer legal in pubs, clubs and restaurants. On 27 September 2019 this ban was confirmed by the Hoge Raad (Supreme Court of the Netherlands).

In 2020 smoking outdoors in all educational facilities and playgrounds was banned. Smoking on train stations was also banned. The smoking ban in the hospitality sector also made Schiphol Airport fully smokefree.

Since 1 January 2022 all smoking areas are banned. Smoking is only allowed at home (even if used as a workplace) and outside (also on terraces that are open at 1 side or more).

=== New Zealand ===
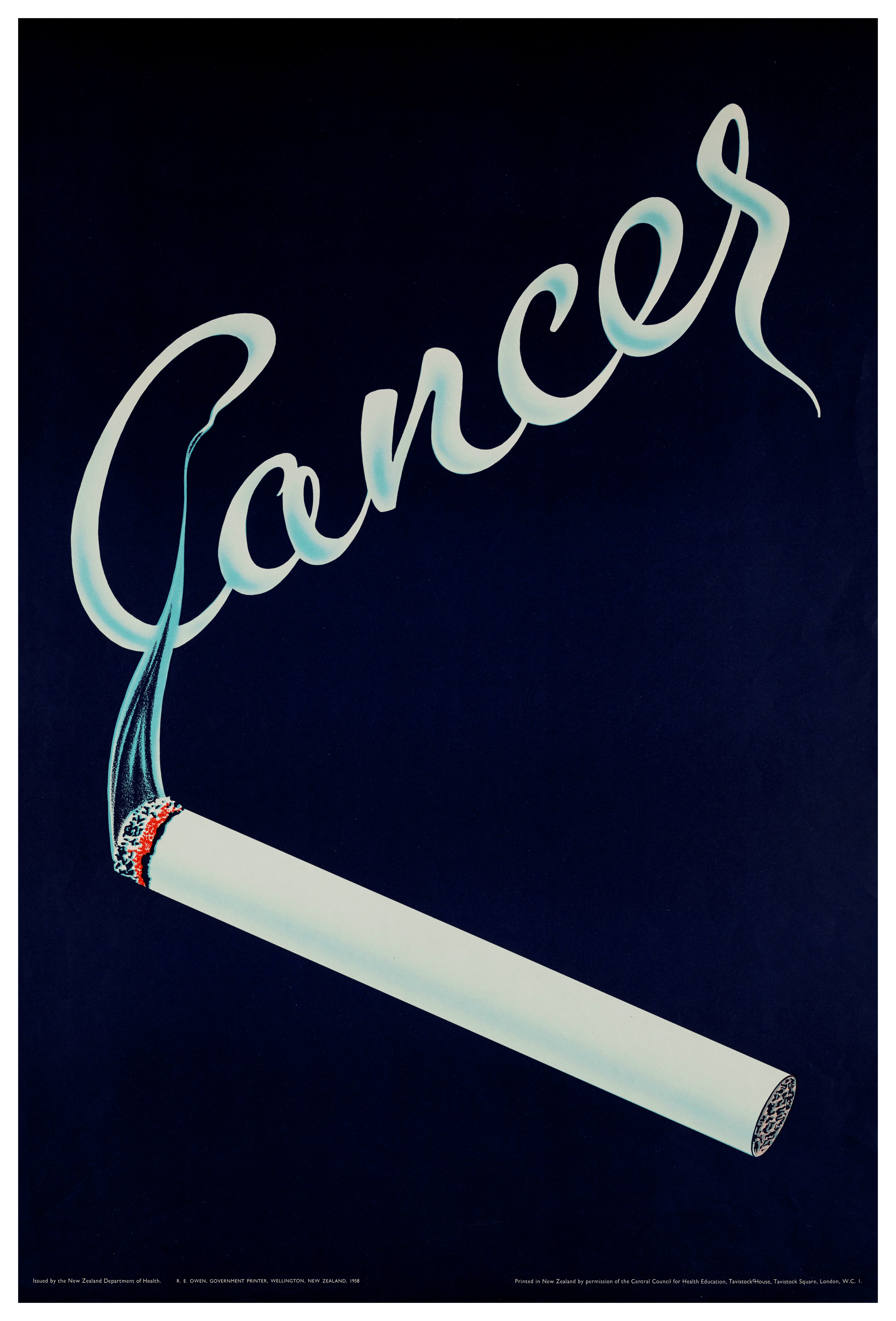
Prevention poster, New Zealand Department of Health, 1958

The first building in the world to have a smoke-free policy was the Old Government Building in Wellington, New Zealand, in 1876. This was over concerns about the threat of fire, as it is the second largest wooden building in the world.

New Zealand passed an amendment to the Smoke-free Environments Act 1990 law on 3 December 2003 (effective in 2004) that covers all indoor public workplaces and inside hospitality venues (pubs, bars, restaurants and casinos). Studies have shown very high levels of compliance with the law. Also the air quality inside hospitality venues is very good compared to similar settings in other countries where smoking is still permitted. In New Zealand, tobacco and tobacco products cannot be sold or supplied to anyone under 18.

Outdoor smoke-free laws cover the grounds of all schools, the grounds of some hospitals, stadiums and two university campuses (Massey University, and the University of Auckland, in 2010). Victoria University of Wellington has restricted smoking rules with specified areas where one may smoke. The government has not moved to restrict smoking in cars but has run mass media campaigns that promote smoke-free cars and homes.

On 8 December 2021, New Zealand's government announced it will phase out the sale of cigarettes for the next generation, meaning those who are aged 14 and under will never be legally able to buy tobacco. The new legislation means the legal age to purchase cigarettes will increase every year, eventually leading to a total prohibition on tobacco sales for the entire population.

The decision to outlaw smoking for the next generation was reversed in November 2023 under the new government.

=== Nigeria ===
Smoking is prohibited in public places in Lagos, Nigeria, and is punishable by a fine of not less than N200 and not exceeding N1000 or to imprisonment to a term of not less than one month and not exceeding two years or to both such fine and imprisonment.

=== North Macedonia ===
North Macedonia has a comprehensive national smoke-free law covering all public indoor areas, and in some cases in outdoor areas. Smoking is prohibited in bars, cafes, restaurants, and nightclubs starting 1 January 2010. However, most businesses and establishments currently ignore the smoke free laws. Smoking is permitted only in people's homes, at open spaces and public areas free of sporting competitions, cultural and entertainment events, gatherings and other public events.

=== Norway ===
In Norway, smoking has been restricted in public buildings, workplaces and public transportation since 1988, often allowing for separate, walled-off smoking areas of restaurants, pubs, etc. Since 1 June 2004, smoking has been prohibited in all indoor public areas. Outside some places this ban includes the immediate area surrounding the doorways, etc. The smoking ban also includes vaping since 1 July 2017.

=== Panama ===
As of 2008, smoking is prohibited at all restaurants, bars, and dance clubs, outdoor dining areas, balconies, and indoor areas such as transport terminals and areas that locals would consider a workplace.

=== Paraguay ===
Effective April 2010, Paraguay has restricted smoking in all indoor areas including bars and restaurants.

=== Pakistan ===
The Prohibition of Smoking and Protection of Non-Smokers Health Ordinance-2002 came into effect on 30 June 2003. The law has the following aspects: restriction upon tobacco use in public buildings and transportation, limiting tobacco advertising, prohibiting tobacco sale within 50 metres of educational institutions, and requiring "no smoking" signs displayed in public places, public buildings and transportation.

=== Peru ===
In Peru, it is slightly banned to smoke in any enclosed public place (inc public transport), according to Law 25357, since December 1993. This has been reinforced with the Anti-Tobacco Law 28705 and 29517.

=== Philippines ===
Davao has prohibited smoking in a large number of public places, including public buildings, entertainment venues, hospitals, shopping malls, concerts since 2002. Smoking at gasoline stations is also banned.

Manila has restricted smoking in large public areas like hospitals, malls, public transport, as well as Makati in 2002 Ordinance 2002–090, banning all public transport and enclosed indoor smoking. After many attempts, finally in June 2011 Metro Manila banned smoking with heavy penalties including community service time for offenders, after 3 months the ban seems to be well respected.

President Duterte has ordered a strict smoking ban, Executive Order 26, forbidding tobacco and e-cigarette use in all public spaces.

=== Poland ===
Smoking is prohibited in schools, hospitals or other medical facilities and public transport (including the vehicles such as train or bus and bus stops, train stations, etc. within the 10 metres (33 ft) radius).

Since 8 April 2010 it is forbidden to smoke in indoor workplaces, and all public indoor spaces, including public offices, museums, bars, cafés, discos, shops or restaurants smaller than 100 square metres. In larger restaurants enclosed smoking areas are permitted, provided they are physically separated and properly ventilated. Smoking is also prohibited in venues for cultural and sporting events.

=== Portugal ===
Portuguese Law 37/2007 (in force since 1 January 2008) governs various aspects of the consumption, sale and control of tobacco in Portugal, and lists a large number of enclosed spaces where smoking is not permitted, including such obvious cases as schools, hospitals and theatres. The law states that exceptions to the no-smoking rule may be made in the cases, inter alia, of enclosed eating and drinking establishments (i.e. restaurants, cafes and bars) not frequented by under-18s if the smoking area is physically separated from the non-smoking area or where ventilation and air extraction systems directed towards the exterior are effective to the point of preventing smoke from entering the non-smoking area, and that in the case of establishments with a floor area of more than 100 square metres no more than 40% (if physically separated) or 30% otherwise may be designated a smoking area. In effect, restaurants are almost always smoke-free as are most cafes whose trade is mainly for food, whereas in bars the law is ignored by customers and bar owners alike. A study published in 2011 by the Ministry of Health showed 90% compliance with the law in establishments with a total smoking ban, but only 50% compliance in establishments where smoking is partly or wholly permitted (i.e., most bars).

=== Qatar ===
The capital of Qatar, Doha, restricted smoking in public or closed areas in 2002.

=== Romania ===
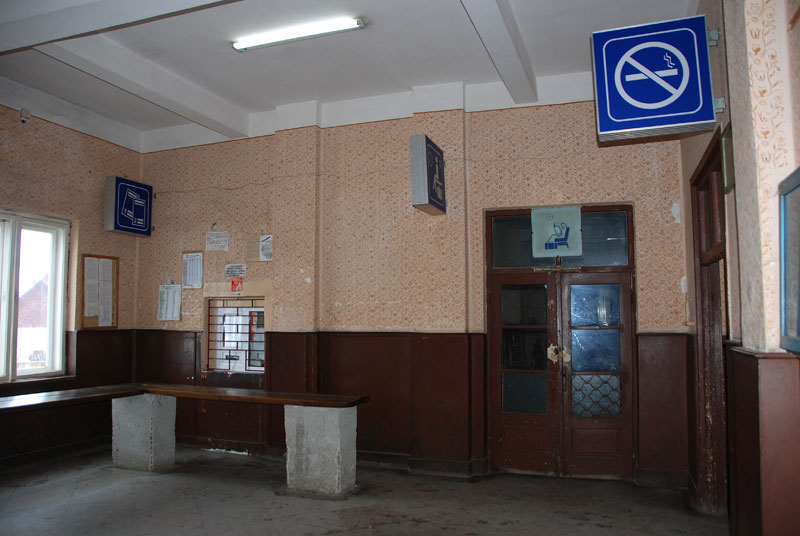
No smoking sign in a rural train station in Romania

Smoking is banned in "indoor public places" such as schools, office buildings and public institutions, though specially designed smoking areas may be established on the premises under certain conditions. Hospitals, CFR passenger trains and the Bucharest Metro, among others, are completely smoke-free. Since 2011, bars and restaurants may be designated either as smoke-free or exclusively for smokers. On 15 December 2015, the Romanian Parliament adopted a law banning smoking in public areas. The law, that came into effect in March 2016 forbids smoking in any closed environment for public use, defining a closed environment as one having at least two walls.

=== Russia ===
Russia had been highly tolerant of smoking for a long time, with almost no regulation. However, the Soviet Union had approved countrywide campaigns against smoking. The law "on the protection of the population from the harmful effects of cigarette smoke and the consequences of tobacco consumption" has passed the third and final vote in the State Duma and has been effective partly from 1 July 2013 and has completely from 1 July 2014. Starting 1 June 2013, smoking in workplaces, on aircraft, trains and municipal transport as well as in schools, hospitals, cultural institutions and government buildings has been restricted and tobacco advertising and sponsorship forbidden. Graphic warnings have become compulsory. Starting 1 June 2014, smoking has also been prohibited in restaurants and cafés. Smokers will also be fined for smoking within a distance of 15 meters in front of entrances of subway stations, the airport or in children playgrounds and parks, as well as places and squares that attract many people.

=== Rwanda ===
The law prohibits smoking in all indoor public places, indoor workplaces, and on public transport, but permits the owner or manager of the premises to create a designated smoking area within the premises. Designated smoking areas must meet certain technical requirements, including separate ventilation. Starting Friday 15 December 2017, Rwanda banned the smoking of water-pipe tobacco popularly known as shisha countrywide.

=== Saudi Arabia ===
Saudi Arabia had almost no restrictions against smoking until 2010 when the Council of Ministers urged the General Authority of Civil Aviation (GACA) to restrict smoking at all airports and their facilities in the Kingdom, and strict rules were imposed. It also advised GACA to impose a fine of SR200 (US$53) on people who violate the new regulations. Many commercial buildings and work places banned smoking at offices in an attempt to stop smoking in public places. In addition, King Fahd University of Petroleum and Minerals in Dhahran, for instance, launched a program in 2010 to make their university smoke-free, and Umm al-Qura University in Mecca launched a campaign with the same title in 2011. In May 2012, King Faisal Specialist Hospital and Research Centre in Riyadh banned people from smoking in and around its buildings, the first such move in the country. The hospital implemented fines of SR200 for violations.

On 30 July 2012, Interior Minister Prince Ahmed bin Abdulaziz ordered the implementation of a royal ban on smoking in all government facilities (ministries, buildings, institutions, offices etc.) and most indoor public places. The ban also prohibits smoking of hookahs in public places, and prohibits selling tobacco to anyone under 18. On 1 December 2012, the Saudi Commission for Tourism & Antiquities (SCTA) imposed a ban on smoking in all tourism facilities.

From 6 June 2016, smoking is prohibited in the vicinity of religious, educational, health, sport and cultural institutions, social and charity institutions. Smoking is also prohibited at private and government offices, factories, banks, public transport facilities, in areas for manufacturing and processing food products and drinks, petrol, gas and fuel distribution systems, warehouses, elevators and restrooms, in addition to several other public places. Violating the law is punishable by a fine of SAR 200, which increases for repeat violations.

=== Serbia ===
The Serbian Parliament passed a new law on public smoking in November 2010. It forbids smoking in every indoor working or public space, and any outdoor space that is a functional part of a facility connected with health care, education, or child care. This law prescribes very high fines for employers and restaurant owners who do not post smoking ban notifications. Outlets (bars, cafés, restaurants, night clubs etc.) smaller than 80 sq m can choose whether to ban smoking or not, and outlets larger than this margin have to have divided areas for smokers and non-smokers.

=== Singapore ===
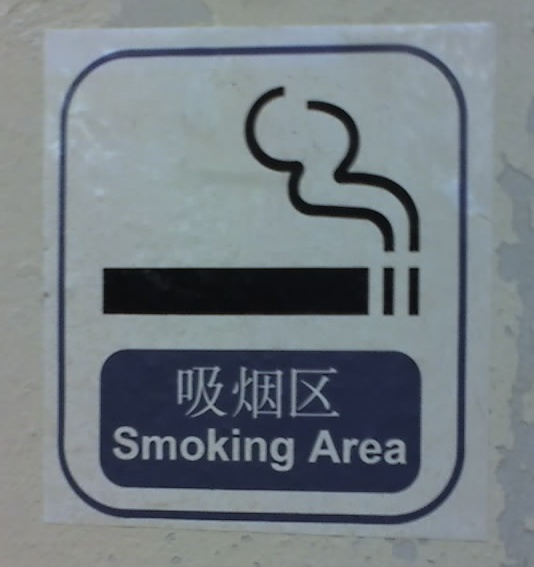
A sign in Singapore to indicate that smoking is allowed

Smoking was restricted in hawker centres, coffee-shops, cafes and fast-food outlets beginning 1 July 2006. For establishments with an outdoor area, 10–20% of the area can be set aside for smoking, although they would have to be clearly marked to avoid confusion. Gradually, the regulations have been extended to bus interchanges and shelters, public toilets and public swimming complexes.

On 1 July 2007, the regulations were extended to entertainment nightspots. The rule allows for construction of designated smoking rooms that can take up to 10% of the total indoor space.

On 1 January 2009, the regulations were extended to all children's playgrounds, exercise areas, markets, underground and multi-storey carparks, ferry terminals and jetties. Coverage was also extended to non-air conditioned areas in offices, factories, shops, shopping complexes and lift lobbies.

Smokers found flouting the rules are fined S$200 while the owners of the establishments are fined S$200 and S$500 for a subsequent offence.

=== Slovakia ===
Since November 2019, Slovakia is the last EU country to still allow smoking in bars and clubs. Smoking is prohibited in most indoor places. Since 2004, employers have been obliged to provide separate smoking rooms or a designated outdoor smoking place if smoking is allowed at work. Smoking is also prohibited in the majority of indoor public places. The regulations currently exempt bars that do not serve food. Restaurants are also excepted from indoor smoking restrictions. Since 2010 there has been no requirement for restaurants to have separate smoking and non-smoking areas. Smoking is also prohibited in shopping centres but a loop-hole in the law allows smoking on the balconies of cafeterias in shopping centres. Enforcement of this law is the responsibility of the Slovak Business Inspection (SOI) service.

There is also a partial restriction upon outdoor smoking, especially around railways stations and bus termini, and close to the entrances of government buildings. Local police forces are responsible for enforcing these laws, although this has on occasion been lax, reportedly due to a mix of corruption and insufficiently clear legislative requirements.

=== Slovenia ===
On 22 June 2007, the Slovenian National Assembly approved a law prohibiting smoking in all indoor public and work places, effective 5 August 2007. Exempted from the ban are "open public areas, special smoking hotel rooms, special smoking areas in elderly care centres and jails, and special smoking chambers in bars and other work places. The smoking chambers, which will have to meet strict technical standards, will however not be allowed to occupy more than 20% of an establishment."

=== Solomon Islands ===
The Solomon Islands has a ban on smoking in many indoor public places, workplaces and public transport but allows smoking in designated areas in workplaces and boats.

=== South Africa ===
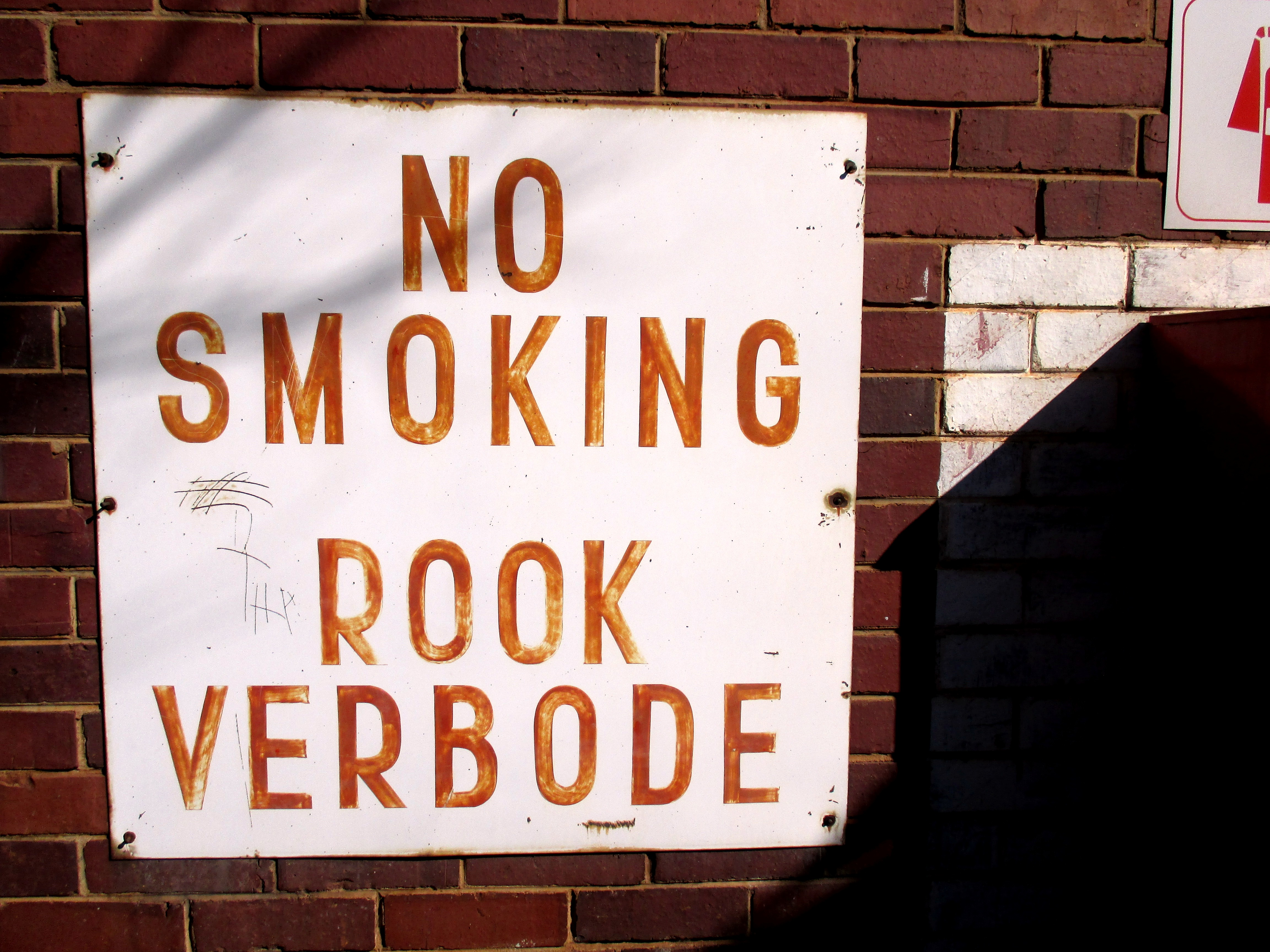
Bilingual "No Smoking" sign in English and Afrikaans at a state-owned facility

The South African government passed the first Tobacco Products Control Act in 1993 and started implementing the act in 1995. The act regulated smoking in public areas and prohibited tobacco sales to people under the age of 18. Some aspects of tobacco advertising were also regulated for example labelling. The 1993 act was not considered to be comprehensive enough and the Tobacco Products Control Amendment Act was passed in 1999. This act prohibits all advertising and promotion of tobacco products, including sponsorship and free distribution of tobacco products. The act also restricts smoking in public places, which includes workplaces, restaurants, bars, and public transport. The act does allow for designated smoking areas (no more than 25% of the total floor area). The act also stipulates penalties for transgressors of the law, and specifies the maximum permissible levels of tar and nicotine. The regulations were implemented in 2001.

The government proposed further amendments to the bill in 2007 that sought to deal with new practices designed to circumvent the Act. These amendments also aim to bring the current law into compliance with the World Health Organization Framework Convention on Tobacco Control (FCTC). This framework has been ratified by the South African government.

=== South Korea ===
South Korea enforced strict smoking bans in public places since July 2013, with fines of ₩100,000 won on any spotted smoker and up to ₩5 million won on shop owners not following the law. It is illegal and strictly prohibited to smoke in all bars and restaurants, cafes, internet cafes, government buildings, kindergartens, schools, universities, hospitals, youth facilities, libraries, children's playgrounds, private academies, subway or train stations and their platforms and underground pathways, large buildings, theaters, department stores or shopping malls, large hotels and highway rest areas.

The strict bans came into force gradually beginning with a ban on places larger than 150 square meters in 2012, extended to 100 square meters in 2014, with a full-fledged complete nationwide ban on 1 January 2015.

=== Spain ===
Spain's first smoking ban was implemented in 1988. Schools, hospitals and public transportation become smoke-free.

The second smoking ban came into force in 1 January 2006 Spain with a partial restriction upon smoking in most public places and workplaces, but restaurants and bars could create a "smokers' section" or allow smoking if they were small (under 100 m^{2}). Advertising of tobacco was banned.

The third and current smoking ban came into force in 2 January 2011. Smoking has been restricted in every indoor public place, including restaurants, bars and cafes. Hotels may designate up to 30% of rooms for smoking; mental hospitals, jails and old people's residences may have public rooms where workers cannot enter. Outdoor smoking is also prohibited at childcare facilities, in children's playparks and around schools and hospital facilities.

Establishments can be closed by the authorities for repeatedly violating the smoke-free law, as happened for the first time on 10 February 2011 in Marbella.

=== Sri Lanka ===
In Sri Lanka, the National Authority on Tobacco and Alcohol Act No. 27 of 2006 restricts smoking in many indoor public spaces, such as government departments, schools, and hospitals. The law permits smoking in designated areas of airports, hotels, and restaurants, while smoking in public transportation is banned.

=== Suriname ===
Suriname has a smoking ban in place.

=== Sweden ===
In Sweden, smoking was restricted in restaurants, cafes, bars and nightclubs in June 2005. Smoking rooms are, however, allowed in these institutions. The smoking rooms contain a few restrictions: no serving or consumption of food or beverages is allowed in the smoking rooms and it may not cover more than 25% of the institution's total area. The smoke-free law was very popular amongst the population and even the industries affected. In January 2008, the Swedish Prison and Probation Service prohibited smoking indoors in prisons.

On 1 July 2019, the smoking ban in Sweden was extended to include outdoor sections of restaurants, playgrounds, sports grounds, and train platforms. Use of electronic cigarettes were also prohibited.

=== Switzerland ===
The Swiss Federal Assembly enacted a law for protection against second-hand smoke in 2008, which came into force on 1 May 2010. It prohibits smoking in enclosed, publicly accessible areas and in rooms that are workplaces for several persons. There are exceptions for bars and restaurants, which may allow smoking in separate, ventilated rooms or in establishments smaller than 80 m^{2}, but the federal statute allows for more stringent cantonal smoking bans.

10 cantons (Jura, Aargau, Obwalden, Nidwalden, Zug, Schwyz, Glarus, Schaffhausen, Thurgau, Appenzell Innerrhoden) have imposed only the national mandated restrictions, with the remaining 16 (Geneva, Vaud, Neuchâtel, Valais, Fribourg, Bern, Solothurn, Basel-City, Basel-Land, Zürich, Uri, Ticino, Graubünden, St. Gallen, Lucerne, Appenzell Ausserrhoden) imposing stricter laws by not excluding establishments smaller than 80 square meters. All 16 cantons however permit separate smoking rooms with 7 (Bern, Solothurn, Zürich, Uri, Ticino, Graubünden, St. Gallen) permitting service.

=== Syria ===
On 11 October 2009, the Syrian president signed legislative decree No.62, banning smoking inside public places. The ban went into effect on 21 April 2010 and included foodservice establishments and public transport. Individuals are subject to a fine of 2,000 SYP for violating this law.

=== Taiwan (Republic of China) ===
Smoking is regulated by the Tobacco Hazards Prevention Act (Taiwan), promulgated on 11 July 2007. In January 2009, the government of Taiwan amended the original 1997 Tobacco Hazards Prevention Act by extending smoke-free areas to include almost all enclosed work-places and public places.

=== Thailand ===
A smoking prohibition sign of a hospital and its perimeter in Si Samrong with a stated fine of THB 5,000

Indoor smoking restrictions have been in effect in all indoor air-conditioned establishments throughout Thailand since November 2002, with entertainment areas exempted.

On 10 January 2008, Thailand announced further restrictions that came into force on 10 February 2008, in that smoking would be banned (indoors and outdoors) in establishments open to the public, including restaurants, bars, and open-air markets. Members of the public face a 2,000 baht fines for not complying, and establishments face a 20,000 baht fine for not enforcing the ban (including not displaying mandated 'no smoking' signs). In addition to fines, those who fail to comply may be arrested.

The concerning law as of the 2010 amendment under the Ministry of Public Health mandates the following areas as strictly smoking-free: healthcare facilities, educational facilities (such as schools and universities), public spaces as well as publicly-shared spaces (including exercising or sporting facilities, stores, clubs, lobbies, corridors, service facilities, offices), religious areas, and inside all public vehicles.

Most legal bars comply with these regulations, but in establishments that operate illegally or semi-legally they are mostly disregarded, as in some entertainment venues located in Bangkok, Pattaya or Phuket.

=== Timor-Leste ===
Timor-Leste has a ban on smoking in many indoor public places, workplaces and public transport but has some exceptions for airports, government facilities and boats.

=== Togo ===
Togo has a smoking ban in place for certain public places.

=== Turkey ===
Turkey currently restricts smoking in government offices, workplaces, bars, restaurants, cafes, shopping malls, schools, hospitals, and all forms of public transport, including trains, taxis and ferries. Turkey's smoke-free law ban includes provisions for violators, where anyone caught smoking in a designated smoke-free area faces a fine of 83 liras (~€35/$47/£30) and bar owners who fail to enforce the law could be fined from 560 liras for a first offence up to 5,600 liras.

Smoking was first restricted in 1997 in public buildings with more than four workers, as well as planes and public buses.

On 3 January 2008, Turkey passed a law prohibiting smoking in all indoor spaces including bars, cafés and restaurants. It also restricts smoking in sports stadia, and the gardens of mosques, hospitals and schools. The smoking ban came into force on 19 May 2008; however, bars, restaurants and cafes were exempted until mid-July 2009. On 19 July 2009, Turkey extended the indoor public smoking restrictions to include bars, restaurants, village coffeehouses and nargile (hookah) bars.

As of April 2026, Turkey's government has openly considered planning gradual moves towards prohibiting smoking completely by 2040.

=== Turkmenistan ===
A decree from President for life Saparmurat Niyazov has prohibited the chewing of tobacco. In 2000, Turkmenistan banned smoking in all public places. People say the ban was implemented because the president was advised by his doctor to quit smoking. In 2002, it was forbidden to smoke while behind the wheel. According to the Code of Administrative violations for smoking cigarettes, including hookah and other tobacco products in the bodies of state power and administration, executive bodies and local authorities, enterprises, institutions and organizations irrespective of ownership, military units and formations, educational institutions, theaters and cinemas, public transport, parks and other places of mass visiting citizens – punishable by a fine in the amount of 100 manats. In January 2016, Turkmen President Gurbanguly Berdimuhamedow banned the sales of all tobacco-related products nationwide, making Turkmenistan the second country in the world (after Bhutan) to implement such policy latest by 2025. Turkmenistan increased the age at which people can buy cigarettes and tobacco products in the country from 18 to 21 years old with effect from 30 November 2022.

=== Turks and Caicos Islands ===
The Turks and Caicos Islands have a smoking ban in place in indoor public places, workplaces and public transport.

=== Uganda ===
In March 2004, smoking was prohibited in public places, including workplaces, restaurants and bars. An extension to private homes is being considered.

=== Ukraine ===
Smoking is banned in all indoor public places, including restaurants, discos, nightclubs, indoor workplaces and all state and cultural institutions, including football stadiums.

=== United Arab Emirates ===
Emirates in the United Arab Emirates recently started restricting smoking in shopping malls, beaches, gardens. The states leading the regulations on smoking are Abu Dhabi, Ajman, Dubai and Sharjah.

=== United Kingdom ===
Since 1 July 2007 smoke-free workplace laws have been in effect across the whole of the UK. These were introduced in each constituent administration of the United Kingdom separately, as decided by the partially devolved governments of Scotland, Wales and Northern Ireland, and the UK Parliament acting for England. For details, see (in chronological order of bans): Scotland, Wales, Northern Ireland and England.

==== England ====
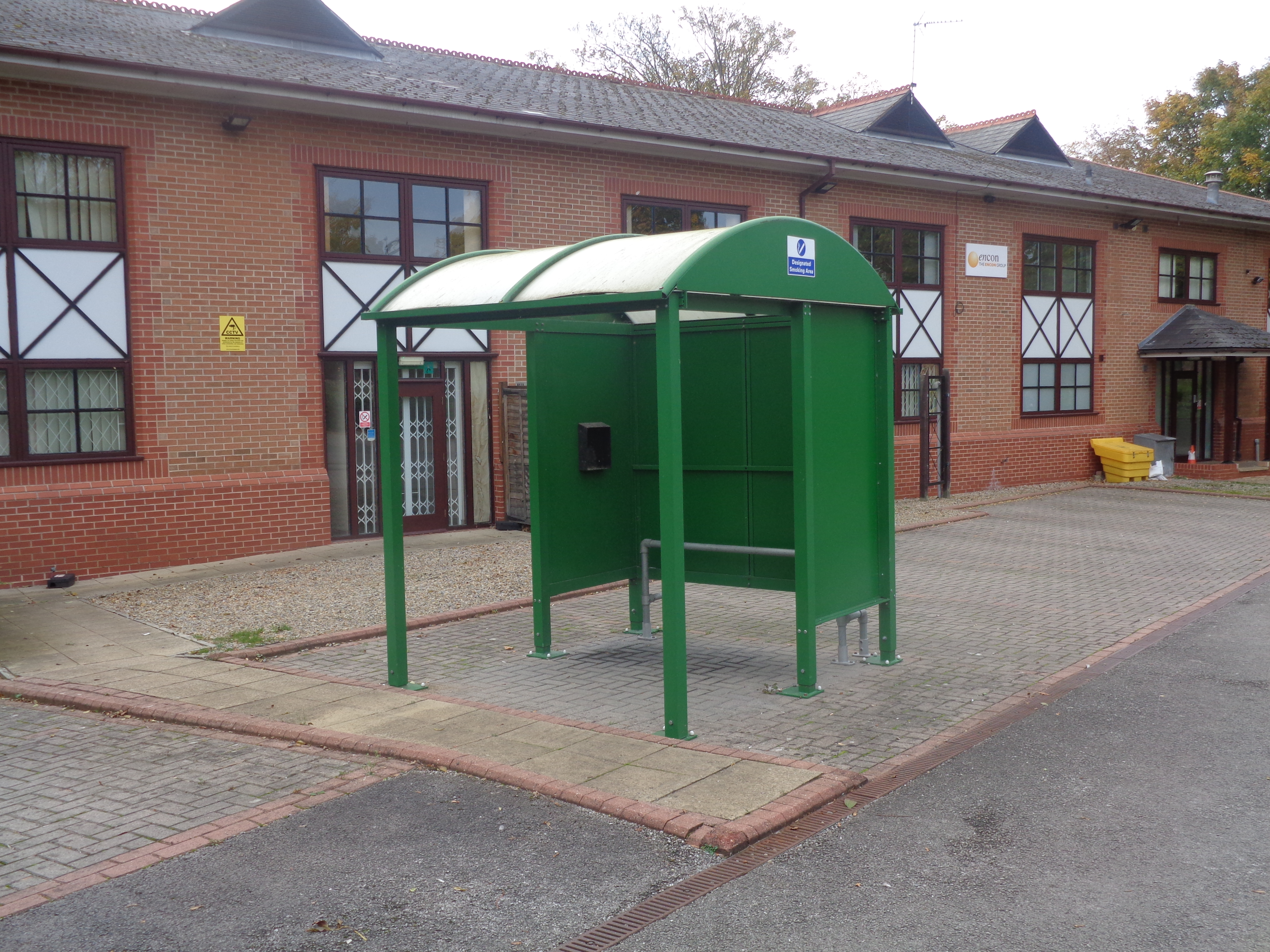
A smoking shelter outside on office building in England. Since 2007 such shelters have become commonplace at workplaces.

Smoke-free regulations covering all indoor work-places in England, including bars, clubs and restaurants, came into force on 1 July 2007. Some places, such as certain smoking hotel rooms, nursing homes, prisons, submarines, offshore oil rigs, and stages/television sets (if needed for the performance) were initially exempted, as well as Royal Palaces, although members of the House of Commons and the House of Lords agreed to ban all smoking in the Palace of Westminster.

The on-the-spot fine for smoking in a workplace is £50 (~€60/~$75), £30 (~€35/~$45) if one pays within 15 days, while a business that allows smoking can be fined £2,500 (~€3,700/~$3,800). Smoking largely remains permitted outdoors, apart from railway stations. However, an internal government briefing obtained by The Independent on Sunday newspaper reveals that powers are available to extend coverage to further outdoor areas if required. A legal loophole exists for cigar smokers who are allowed to smoke in store to 'sample' the cigar in England only.

==== Northern Ireland ====
In Northern Ireland, a smoke-free law has been in effect since 30 April 2007. It is illegal to smoke in all enclosed workplaces. This includes bars, restaurants, offices (even if the smoker is the only person in the office) and public buildings. Like Scotland, the smoke-free law is comprehensive in that places such as telephone boxes and enclosed bus/train shelters are included. The on-the-spot fine for smoking in a workplace is £50 (~€70/~$100), while a business that allows smoking can be fined £2,500 (~€3,700/~$5,000).

A £200 fine may be levied by local councils if businesses fail to display no-smoking signs. An opinion poll showed that 91% of people supported the law.

==== Scotland ====
On 26 March 2006, Scotland prohibited smoking in enclosed (more than 50% covered) public places, which includes public buildings, workplaces, sports stadiums, bars and restaurants. Exemptions are in place to allow hotel guests to smoke in their own rooms, as long as the hotel has designated them as smoking rooms. The law restricts smoking in bus shelters, phone boxes or other shelters that are more than 50% enclosed. It also prohibits smoking in trucks and vans owned by a company, whether or not the driver is the only person inside (though smoking while driving was already legally questionable as it could be presented as "driving without due care and attention"). Nevertheless, the ban on smoking in work vehicles is commonly flouted, especially by tradesmen, and compliance with outdoor bans is minimal. There are no restrictions on smoking in railway stations as the railway bylaw applies only to England, and smoking remains common in outdoor areas of railway stations. Compliance with the indoor ban in pubs, restaurants and other workplaces is almost universal. Businesses covered by the smoking ban must display a statutory smoking sign at the entrance to, and around the building as well as a smoke-free policy. Opinion polls at its introduction showed a clear majority of the Scottish public were in favour of the ban.

As in New Zealand, the smoke-free law was initially criticised by certain interested groups (e.g., publicans, cafe and bingo hall owners, etc.) who feared that it would adversely impact their businesses. A survey published by the Scottish Beer & Pubs Association one year on from implementation concluded that "the number of pub licensed premises in Scotland has remained more or less constant over the last year" indicating fears of an adverse impact of the ban on the hospitality industry were unfounded. Widespread concerns prior to implementation about the impact on bingo halls prove harder to objectively assess: As at May 2008 there is anecdotal evidence to suggest an increase in closures of bingo halls since implementation. However, no statistical analysis has been conducted and speculation within the betting and gaming industry is that a decline could also be the result of demographic changes and increases in online gaming.

The NHS Scotland Quit Smoking Line reported it received an additional 50,000 calls from people wishing to give up in the six months after the smoke-free law was introduced. In September 2007 a study of nine Scottish hospitals over the twelve months following implementation reported positively on its impact on the country's health, including a 17% drop in admissions for heart attacks, compared with average reductions of 3% per year for the previous decade.

==== Wales ====
Smoking was restricted across all enclosed public premises and work premises in Wales on 2 April 2007. Adherence is widespread and many public houses have closed since the law came into place.

Public places must display a special bilingual no smoking sign:

- "Mae ysmygu yn y fangre hon yn erbyn y gyfraith" (Welsh)
- "It is against the law to smoke in these premises" (English)

In addition, Wales introduced a smoking ban outside schools and hospitals in March 2021.

=== United Nations ===
As United Nations buildings are not the subject of any national jurisdiction, the United Nations has its own smoking and non-smoking policies. Following the gradual introduction of partial smoking restrictions between 1985 and 2003, Secretary-General Kofi Annan introduced in 2003 a total prohibition upon smoking at United Nations Headquarters. Similar restrictions have not been introduced in field offices of the United Nations worldwide. Some specialised agencies of the United Nations, such as the United Nations Children's Fund and the World Health Organization have their own strict smoke-free regulations that apply to their offices worldwide, but the same is not necessarily true for entities of the Secretariat, such as the Department of Peacekeeping Operations and the Office for the Coordination of Humanitarian Affairs (OCHA). Only on 13 December 2007, OCHA introduced a smoke-free regulation applicable to all its field offices.

=== United States ===
Statewide smoking bans in the United States as of December 2019:
No ban
Banned in restaurants
Banned in restaurants and bars
Banned in non-hospitality workplaces
Banned in restaurants and non-hospitality workplaces
Banned in all workplaces
*Many localities impose stricter rules than state law

Effective April 1998, inflight smoking is banned by the United States Department of Transportation on all commercial passenger flights in the United States or by American air carriers. On 9 August 1997, President Bill Clinton issued Executive Order 13058, banning smoking in all interior spaces owned, rented, or leased by the Executive Branch of the Federal Government, as well as in any outdoor areas under executive branch control near air intake ducts.

There is no federal law in the United States concerning smoking in private businesses and workplaces. Therefore, such policies are entirely a product of state and local criminal and occupational safety and health laws. As a result, the existence and aggressiveness of smoking bans varies widely throughout the United States, ranging from total bans (even outdoors), to no regulation of smoking at all. Jurisdictions in the greater South tend to have the least restrictive smoking bans or no statewide bans at all. In the U.S., 28 states, Washington, D.C., Puerto Rico and the U.S. Virgin Islands, plus hundreds of cities and counties, have enacted comprehensive smoke-free laws covering workplaces, restaurants, and bars.

According to Americans for Nonsmokers' Rights, as of January 2021, 82.1% of the U.S. population is covered by bans on smoking in "workplaces, and/or restaurants, and/or bars, by either a state, commonwealth, or local law," although only 61.1% are covered by bans in all workplaces and restaurants and bars.

As of October 2018, 29 states have banned smoking in all general workplaces and public places, including bars and restaurants (though many of these exempt tobacconists, cigar bars, casinos, private clubs, and/or small workplaces). Six have enacted smoking bans exempting all adult venues including bars, and in some cases casinos and restaurants (Tennessee exempts any place not admitting patrons under 21). Georgia, Idaho, Nevada, New Hampshire, North Carolina, and Virginia have particularised state laws banning smoking in specific places but leaving out all others. The remaining 10 states have no statewide smoking bans at all, though many cities and/or counties in those states have enacted local smoking bans to varying degrees (except Oklahoma, which prohibits local governments from regulating smoking at all).

As for U.S. jurisdictions that are not states, as of November 2012 smoking is banned in all public places (including bars and restaurants) in American Samoa, the District of Columbia, Puerto Rico and United States Virgin Islands. Guam prohibits smoking in restaurants, but not in any other workplaces. The Northern Mariana Islands prohibits smoking in most workplaces and in restaurants but not in bars.

==== Puerto Rico ====
The Law No. 40 from 1993, the Law to Regulate the Smoking Practice in Public Places, and its later 1996 amendment Law 133, regulate smoking in private and public places. The most recent modification established in [2 March 2007], Law 66, amended articles 2, 3, 4, 5, 6, 9 and 11 of Law Num. 40, forbids this practice inside jails, pubs, restaurants (including open-air terraces with one or more employees), bars, casinos, workplaces, educational institutions, cars with children under age 13 and most public places. Smoking sections are not allowed. Fines start at $250.

=== Uruguay ===
In March 2006, it became illegal in Uruguay to smoke in enclosed public spaces. Now bars, restaurants or offices where people are caught smoking face fines of more than $1,100 or a three-day closure. This makes Uruguay the first country in South America to ban smoking in enclosed public spaces.

=== Vatican City ===
A July 2002 law signed by Pope John Paul II banned smoking on all places accessible to the public, and in all closed places of work within the Vatican City, and within all extraterritorial properties of the Holy See. Smoking bans in museums, libraries and churches on Vatican territory had already been in force for a long time. In November 2017, Pope Francis banned the sale of cigarettes throughout Vatican City; the sale of cigars is still legal.

=== Venezuela ===
On 31 May 2011 Venezuela introduced a ban on smoking in all enclosed public and commercial spaces, including malls, restaurants, bars, discos, workplaces, etc.

On 1 August 2023, Venezuela also introduced a ban on the production, sale and consumption of e-cigarettes.

=== Vietnam ===
The Vietnamese government has banned smoking in offices, production facilities, schools, hospitals, and on public transport. However, bus drivers, especially in north Vietnam, occasionally smoke. Smoking was banned in enclosed indoor spaces and public facilities in Ho Chi Minh City in 2005 with the exception of entertainment areas.

Beginning from 2025, Vietnam will ban all production, sale and consumption of e-cigarettes.

=== Zambia ===
Smoking is prohibited in public places in Zambia and is punishable by a fine of K400 or imprisonment of up to two years.

== Specific restrictions ==
=== Outdoor smoking restrictions ===
- It is illegal to smoke at a bus shelter in Ireland. It was also the first country in the world to impose a restriction upon smoking outdoors within three metres (9.8 ft) of a public building.
- In Costa Rica, it is also illegal to smoke at a bus shelter or at queues for the bus, train, etc. It is also forbidden to smoke in public parks and recreational areas.
- In the Australian state of Queensland, smoking is prohibited within four metres of entrances to public buildings, within 10 metres of children's playground equipment, in commercial outdoor eating or drinking areas, at patrolled beaches, and at all major sports stadiums.
  - Some beaches in Sydney, Australia have smoking restrictions in place.
  - Smoking on land owned by the New South Wales Department of Education is prohibited.
- Cambridge Memorial Hospital in Cambridge, Ontario, Canada, enacted a total (outdoor) smoke-free regulation, believed to be the first in the entire province if not country, as of October 2004. At the same time, Wilfrid Laurier University in the nearby city of Waterloo, Ontario, proposed a similar total smoke-free regulation on its property, after its 10 metre outdoor proximity restriction (enacted in 2002) failed. WLU was presumed to be the third Canadian (public) post-secondary institution to consider such measures, after Carleton and Acadia.
  - Smoking is prohibited in Hamilton Street Railway bus shelters in Hamilton, Ontario.
  - It is illegal to smoke on a bus or at a bus shelter in Winnipeg, Manitoba.
  - It is illegal to smoke on a bus or at a bus shelter as well as less than 4 metres from any entrance in Halifax, Nova Scotia.
  - Calgary, Alberta, prohibited all outdoor patio smoking at bars, restaurants and casinos on 1 July 2005. Nova Scotia did the same on 1 December 2006.
- Calabasas, California, United States, prohibited smoking in almost all indoor and outdoor public places in 2006, believed to be the strictest such regulations in the United States. At least 13 California cities (including Los Angeles) have prohibited smoking on their beaches, at least four other California cities (including San Francisco) ban smoking in parks or outdoor venues. For more information, see List of smoking bans in the United States#Outdoor smoking bans.
  - Belmont, California, prohibited smoking in outdoor places on 25 September 2007; this also applies inside condominiums, apartments and other kinds of multi-unit housing.
  - California has prohibited smoking within 20 feet (6.1 m) of entrances to any public building.
- Selected wards in Tokyo, Japan, prohibit smoking on the streets; this is enforced and violators are fined.
  - 56% of Chiyoda ward's land area is a no-smoking zone as of April 2007.
  - Kyoto, Japan, has prohibited smoking on 7.1 km of its streets in 2007, including busy areas along Kawaramachi, Karasuma-dori and Shijo Street avenues.
  - Railway stations in Japan are no-smoking except for a few remaining long-distance services.
- Many UK NHS organisations prohibit smoking on their premises both inside and outside hospitals, including places such as car parks.
  - Addenbrooke's Hospital in Cambridge, has banned smoking on all of its sites, including private homes that are on hospital grounds since 1 January 2014.
  - Oxford University Hospitals NHS Trust has had a ban on smoking on its sites since 2007, but in 2013 admitted that the ban was unenforceable, and will be installing outdoor smoking shelters.
- Wales introduced a smoking ban outside schools and hospitals in Summer 2019.
- In Hong Kong, smoking restrictions are imposed on most public recreational areas and beaches. It is up to districts to designate which public recreational areas are exempt, and some prohibit smoking districtwide. Many playgrounds in public housing estates have also become smoke-free. Some public transport interchanges, as designated by the government, have been smoke-free since 1 September 2009.
- Smoking is prohibited on all railway platforms in England, regardless of whether they are covered or not. These measures were introduced before any national smoking ban for safety reasons.
- It is illegal to smoke on the outdoor property of the institutions of public education in Slovenia, penalties are dictated by internal orders of the concerned institutions.
- It is illegal to smoke at some bus shelters (complex rules determine which, leading to variable compliance) and inside telephone boxes in Scotland.

=== Other restrictions ===
In some countries, such as Germany, India and Russia, earlier smoke-free regulations allowed for smoking sections in restaurants, as well as possible special rooms for use by smokers in other workplaces (though many employers prefer not to incur the costs of building and maintaining such rooms).

- All public and Catholic schools in the Region of Waterloo in Ontario, Canada, prohibited smoking on school property in Autumn 1994. A province-wide smoking ban on school property was scheduled to begin for the 2007–2008 school year in British Columbia, Canada.
- A tobacco fatwa was issued in Iran in 1891 and Egypt in 2000.
- Australia has a federal law prohibiting the manufacture and sale of all smokeless tobacco products. The sale of oral snuff and chewing tobacco has been banned since 1989 under the Trade Practices Act 1974.
- Many colleges and universities have banned smoking on campus.

== International treaties ==
International treaties that ban smoking:

- Australia, Canada and the United States banned smoking on flights between their countries on 1 March 1995.

== Proposed smoke-free laws ==
In the United Kingdom, the Labour government submitted the Tobacco and Vapes Bill to Parliament on 5 November 2024 proposing the creation of a "smoke-free generation", whereby the sale of tobacco products to persons born on or after 1 January 2009 would be prohibited. The bill also proposes a total ban on the manufacture and sale of snus and various further restrictions and powers of regulation.

In Spain the government approved on 9 September 2025 an anteproyecto de ley del tabaco (draft bill to modify the existing law 28/2005) with major restrictions. In particular it includes the Expansion of smoke-free spaces to include terraces of bars/restaurants, exteriors of educational, social, health and university centers, outdoor sports facilities, public transport stops and stations, open-air concerts/spectacles, outdoor pools, and vehicles used for work. It also includes a “reinforced protection” around health, educational, cultural, sports, social, and playground areas, and puts the new nicotine/tobacco products at the same level of traditional tobacco products as cigaretttes. In addition, the sale and supply of single-use disposable e-cigarettes should become forbidden. The draft plans to make also the possession and consumption by persons under 18 forbidden (and not only the sale), and to add restrictions to advertising and sponsorship of tobacco and related products. The parliamentary debate and amendment may change the final text.

== Lack of smoke-free regulation ==
As of 2020, several countries have no legislation restricting smoking whatsoever, including Central African Republic, and other countries in Central and West Africa.

== See also ==
- Anti-tobacco movement in Nazi Germany
- MPOWER tobacco control
- Philip Morris v. Uruguay
- Regulation of electronic cigarettes
- Smokeasy
- TNCO ceilings
- Tobacco control
- World Health Organization Framework Convention on Tobacco Control
- World No Tobacco Day
