= TNCO ceilings =

The Tar, Nicotine and Carbon monoxide ceilings (or TNCO ceilings) are the average upper limits on total aerosol residue, nicotine and carbon monoxide contents of a cigarette, as measured on a smoking machine and according to a given set of ISO standards. Because these refer to machine-generated yields rather than the average smoker's intake, these values have often been decried as misleading.

A growing number of countries are nevertheless using such values as upper yield limitations for the cigarettes marketed under their jurisdiction.

== Africa ==
Country	Tar	Nicotine	CO	As of
Democratic Republic of the Congo	15	1.5	-	2007 07
Egypt	15	2	-	2005 01
Libya	12	0.8	-	
South Africa	12	1.2	-	2006 06

(All values in mg/cigarette and must be reported on packs.)

Most countries on the continent do not impose maximum values for either tar, nicotine or CO, but Burkina Faso, Benin, Cape Verde, Morocco nevertheless demand that yield values be reported on pack.

== Americas ==
Country	Tar	Nicotine	CO	As of
Honduras	14	1.1	-	1995 11
Brazil	10	1	10	2001 12

(All values in mg/cigarette and must be reported on packs.)

Whereas Ecuador prohibits the indication of TNCO yields, Canada, El Salvador, Jamaica, Mexico, Panama and Peru require these values to be indicated without mandating upper limits. Canada demands values measured both with ISO standards and Health Canada's Intensive Method, as well as the yields for formaldehyde, hydrogen cyanide and benzene.

== Asia & Pacific ==
Country	Tar	Nicotine	CO	As of
Brunei	15	1.3	-	2008 02
China	11	-	-	2013 01
Hong Kong	17	-	-	1999 07
Macau	20	1.5	-	1996 08
Malaysia	10	1.0	10	1993 05
Mongolia	15	1.4	-	-
South Korea	8	0.7	-	-
Singapore	10	1.0	-	2013 03
Taiwan	12	1.2	-	2007 07
Vietnam	16	2.2	-	2007 03

(All values in mg/cigarette and must be reported on packs (see exceptions below).)

Although many countries in the region do not impose formal ceilings, some still request that tar and nicotine yield values be indicated on the pack (India, Indonesia, Japan). In Brunei, Malaysia and Vietnam, on the other hand, measured values must only be reported to the government.

== Eastern Europe and former CIS ==
Country	Tar	Nicotine	CO	As of
Albania	10	1	10	2007 05
Armenia	14	1.2	-	2005 12
Belarus	14	1.2	-	-
Croatia	12	-	-	-
Georgia	10	1	-	2005 04
Kazakhstan	14	1.2	-	2003 07
Kyrgyzstan	14	1.2	-	
North Macedonia	10	1	10	2008 03
Moldova	15	1.2	-	2008 01
Montenegro	10	1	10	2004 02
Russia	10	1	10	2010 06
Serbia	14	1.4	14	2007 01
Turkmenistan	16	1.4	-	-
Ukraine	15	1.3	-	1997 07
Uzbekistan	16	1.4	-	-

(All values in mg/cigarette and must be reported on packs.)

While Kosovo should soon enact regulation imposing ceilings, Bosnia-Herzegovina only requires tar and nicotine yields to be indicated, without imposing maximal values.

== Western Europe ==
Country	Tar	Nicotine	CO	As of
Austria	10	1	10	2004 01
Belgium	10	1	10	2004 01
Bulgaria	10	1	10	2008 01
Cyprus	10	1	10	2004 05
Czech Republic	10	1	10	2004 05
Denmark	10	1	10	2004 01
Estonia	10	1	10	2006 06
Finland	10	1	10	2004 01
France	10	1	10	2004 01
Germany	10	1	10	2004 01
Greece	10	1	10	2007 01
Hungary	10	1	10	2004 04
Iceland	10	1	10	2004 01
Ireland	10	1	10	2003 09
Italy	10	1	10	2004 01
Latvia	10	1	10	2004 10
Liechtenstein	10	1	10	2004 10
Lithuania	10	1	10	2004 06
Luxembourg	10	1	10	2004 01
Malta	10	1	10	2004 04
Netherlands	10	1	10	2004 01
Norway	10	1	10	2004 01
Poland	10	1	10	2004 03
Portugal	10	1	10	2004 01
Romania	10	1	10	2007 01
Slovakia	10	1	10	2006 07
Slovenia	10	1	10	2004 01
Spain	10	1	10	2004 01
Sweden	10	1	10	2004 01
Switzerland	10	1	10	2004 10
United Kingdom	10	1	10	2003 09

(All values in mg/cigarette.)

Current regulations are based on European Union directive "2001/37" (PDF). (220 KiB). All yields must be indicated on the side of the pack with a minimum surface area of 10%, except for Belgium, Cyprus, Finland, Luxembourg, Malta (12%), Liechtenstein & Switzerland (15%) and Italy (20%).

The maximum levels have been previously limited to 15 mg tar (1992), then to 12 mg tar (01-1998), without maximum levels for nicotine and CO.

== Middle East ==
Country	Tar	Nicotine	CO	As of
Bahrain	10	0.6	12	1995 01
Jordan	10	1	15	2004 01
Kuwait	10	0.6	12	1995 01
Oman	10	0.6	12	1995 01
Palestinian Authority	25	1.6	-	2005 07
Qatar	10	0.6	12	1995 01
Saudi Arabia	10	0.6	12	1995 01
Syria	13	1.1	10.5	2007 01
Turkey	12	1	10	2007 01
United Arab Emirates	10	0.6	12	1995 01
Yemen	12	0.8	-	1995 01

(All values in mg/cigarette and must be reported on packs (see exceptions below.)

The Palestinian Authority and Yemen do not require tar and nicotine values to be indicated on the packs' side.

== See also ==
- List of smoking bans
