= Smoking in North Macedonia =

Tobacco smoking, cultivation and control in North Macedonia

Tobacco leaves drying in Veljusa, North Macedonia

Smoking in North Macedonia is common among adults. A nationally representative survey conducted in 2019 found that 48.4% of adults aged 18–85 were current smokers, including 57.9% of men and 39.0% of women. The World Health Organization (WHO) estimated that 39.5% of people aged 15 and older smoked tobacco in 2023, based on modelled, age-standardised estimates.

North Macedonia has a longstanding tradition of cultivating oriental tobacco, particularly in the Pelagonia region around Prilep. Tobacco remains an important agricultural crop and a source of income for some rural households. Tobacco-control measures include restrictions on smoking in public places, taxation and health warnings on tobacco packaging. North Macedonia ratified the WHO Framework Convention on Tobacco Control in 2006.

== History ==
Tobacco cultivation spread through the Balkans during the Ottoman period, and the region developed a tradition of producing aromatic tobacco varieties commonly known as oriental tobacco.

During the late Ottoman period, tobacco production and trade were affected by the Tobacco Régie, a monopoly established in 1883 through arrangements involving the Ottoman state and the Ottoman Public Debt Administration. The system regulated tobacco purchasing, processing and sales in Ottoman territories, including Macedonia and Thrace.

Prilep became a centre of tobacco purchasing and processing. According to the published history of Tutunski kombinat Prilep, the city's first tobacco warehouse was established in 1873.

Following the establishment of the Kingdom of Serbs, Croats and Slovenes, tobacco cultivation and research became increasingly institutionalised. A tobacco trial station was established in Prilep in 1924 under the administration of state monopolies.

During the Yugoslav socialist period, tobacco processing and cigarette manufacturing developed through state enterprises. Tutunski kombinat Prilep began cigarette production in 1954, according to the company's published history. Jugotutun, based in Skopje, was involved in the tobacco trade. Socotab acquired the company in 1996, according to a report by Tobacco Asia.

Tobacco cultivation and processing remained part of the agricultural economy after North Macedonia declared independence in 1991.

== Prevalence ==
A nationally representative survey conducted in 2019 and published by Analytica in 2020 found that 48.4% of adults aged 18–85 were current smokers. The prevalence was 57.9% among men and 39.0% among women. The survey reported the highest prevalence among people aged 45–54.

A separate study reported by the WHO in 2023 found that 45.4% of adults in North Macedonia were regular tobacco smokers. According to the study, 70% of smokers had started smoking before the age of 21.

The WHO's 2025 country profile estimated the prevalence of current tobacco smoking among people aged 15 and older at 39.5% in 2023, with estimates of 43.6% among men and 35.5% among women. Daily smoking prevalence was estimated at 34.1%. These modelled, age-standardised estimates are intended for international comparison and are not directly equivalent to results from individual national surveys.

Smoking is a risk factor for cardiovascular disease, respiratory disease and several types of cancer. Exposure to secondhand smoke is also associated with adverse health effects. The WHO has identified the high prevalence of tobacco use in North Macedonia as a public-health concern.

== Cultivation and industry ==
North Macedonia produces oriental tobacco, including varieties associated with the Prilep region. Tobacco is cultivated in several parts of the country, including the Pelagonia and Vardar statistical regions.

According to the State Statistical Office's 2024 statistical yearbook, the harvested area for tobacco in 2023 was 14,900 hectares, and production totalled 23,713 tonnes. Production varies between years according to agricultural conditions and other factors.

Tobacco farming provides income for some rural households. A survey-based study published by Analytica in 2023 examined the economics of tobacco farming and the relationships between growers and tobacco-leaf buyers. It reported that most of the farmers surveyed had contracts with buyers.

The WHO has also examined the economic effects of tobacco cultivation in the country. It reported that North Macedonia spent approximately US$32 million on tobacco subsidies in 2020, highlighting the role of government support in the agricultural sector.

== Illicit tobacco ==
Illicit tobacco trade and tax evasion have been examined in studies of tobacco consumption in North Macedonia. Research has distinguished between manufactured cigarettes and hand-rolled tobacco, as well as between illegal purchases and other forms of tax avoidance.

A study published in the journal Tobacco Control in 2022 analysed tobacco tax evasion in six Western Balkan jurisdictions, including North Macedonia, using data from a 2019 regional survey. It found that the prevalence of tax evasion varied substantially between countries and between manufactured cigarettes and hand-rolled tobacco.

A separate report by Analytica examined illicit trade in manufactured cigarettes and hand-rolled tobacco in North Macedonia. The study identified tax evasion involving hand-rolled tobacco as a particular issue, while finding that the market for manufactured cigarettes was predominantly supplied through legal channels.

== Public opinion and smoking cessation ==
A nationally representative survey of 1,006 adults conducted in 2019 and published by Analytica in 2020 examined attitudes towards smoking and tobacco-control measures. It found that 81% of smokers considered smoking harmful or very harmful. In the same survey, 83% of respondents considered cigarettes expensive or very expensive, and 55.7% considered higher tobacco prices a useful measure for reducing tobacco consumption.

A WHO study reported in 2023 examined attitudes towards smoking and barriers to cessation. It found that 17% of respondents believed that smoking was generally disapproved of in North Macedonia, while 53% of smokers said they did not plan to quit. Although 70% of smokers said a healthcare worker had motivated them to quit, only 14% of current smokers and recent quitters reported discussing smoking with a health professional during the preceding 12 months.

The study identified opportunities to improve cessation support through healthcare services and public-health interventions.

== Legislation and tobacco control ==
North Macedonia's Law on Protection from Smoking was enacted in 1995 and has subsequently been amended. The legislation regulates smoking in specified public places and includes provisions intended to protect people from exposure to tobacco smoke.

A comprehensive smoking ban in public spaces was introduced in 2010. Subsequent amendments changed aspects of the restrictions, including provisions concerning designated outdoor areas.

The WHO's 2025 country profile assessed tobacco-control measures in force as of 31 December 2024. It recorded complete smoke-free laws for several settings, including government facilities, educational facilities, healthcare facilities, indoor workplaces and public transport. However, its compliance assessment identified shortcomings in the implementation of smoke-free rules in restaurants, cafés, pubs and bars.

North Macedonia ratified the WHO Framework Convention on Tobacco Control on 30 June 2006. The convention provides an international framework for tobacco-control measures, including the protection of people from tobacco smoke, tobacco taxation and restrictions on tobacco advertising.

In January 2026, the Ministry of Health published a proposal for a new Law on Protection from Smoking. The proposed legislation included broader restrictions on smoking in indoor public and workplace settings and measures concerning tobacco and nicotine products. In February 2026, the ministry stated that it was finalising the proposal following public consultation before submitting a final version to the government.

== Electronic cigarettes and heated tobacco products ==
Electronic cigarettes and heated tobacco products have been examined in tobacco-control research in North Macedonia.

An exploratory study published by Analytica in 2024, conducted in collaboration with the World Bank, examined patterns of use and perceptions of these products. It reported that electronic cigarettes and heated tobacco products were more popular among younger users and that some users perceived them as healthier alternatives to conventional cigarettes.

The WHO has published separate assessments of electronic cigarettes and heated tobacco products, addressing their health effects and the limitations of evidence concerning some long-term outcomes.

== See also ==
- Health in North Macedonia
- Economy of North Macedonia
- Oriental tobacco
- Regie Company
- Tobacco control
