= Ginette Mathiot =

French food writer and home economist

Ginette Mathiot, Officier de la Légion d'Honneur, (French: [ʒinɛt matjo]; 23 May 1907 – 14 June 1998) was a French food writer and home economist.

Mathiot wrote over 30 books including the famous Je sais cuisiner which sold over 6 million copies; she also wrote the famous *Je sais faire la pâtisserie (The Art of French Baking), which has been updated and published by Phaidon in 2011. She never married and used traditional cooking methods to design cookbooks which the young wife caring for a young family could read and understand with ease. She is well known in France and her recipes are still used today by some of the most celebrated chefs, and millions of copies of her recipe books have been sold.

She pursued a long career in education, first as a home economics teacher, and later as the Inspectrice générale de l'enseignement ménager de la Ville de Paris then finally as the Inspector General overseeing the teaching of Home Economics in France.

== Publications (selected) ==
La cuisine pour tous

La cuisine pour tous, Je sais cuisiner, The French Pocket Cookbook, or I Know How to Cook is the best known of Mathiot's books. Originally published in 1932 as La cuisine pour tous, it has been updated numerous times (both during and after Mathiot's life), and was retitled Je sais cuisiner in 2002. La cuisine pour tous Albin Michel, 1955 was reprinted by Le Livre de Poche, 1963. It was first translated into English in 1965 as The French Pocket Cookbook (translation by E. B. Hennessy), and then again in 2009 as I Know How to Cook.

Other books

- Je sais faire la pâtisserie Albin Michel
- Je sais faire les conserves Albin Michel
- La cuisine à l'école et à la maison Albin Michel (with Marie-Louis Cordillot & Janine Briand)
- Les comptes de la maison Fernand Lanore
- Notions de comptabilité familiale Fernand Lanore (with Mme Mereau)

Translations other than English

- 1967 : Cucina Internazionale ed Esotica - 600 Ricette da Tutto il Mondo (in Italian)
- 1970 : Världen runt i mitt eget kök (in Swedish)
- 1973 : Yo se cocinar: Lo mejor de la gastronomia francesa (in Spanish)
- 1978 : Deltas kookboek voor jou en mij (in Dutch)
- 1978 : Het grote kookboek van de Franse keuken (in Dutch)
- 1993 : Koken voor 2 (in Dutch)
- 2011 : The Art of French Baking; translated and adapted by Clotilde Dusoulier from Je sais faire la pâtisserie
