= Miral (disambiguation) =

Miral is a 2010 French biographical political film directed by Julian Schnabel.

Miral may also refer to:

- Miral (name), list of people with the name
- Miral (2022 film), an Indian film
- Miral Asset Management, holding company in Abu Dhabi
- Château de Miral, castle in France
- MV Princess Miral, Turkish cargo ship
