= Rachael Bermingham =

Australian entrepreneur, author, public speaker, mentor, TV personality and hairdresser

Rachael Bermingham is an Australian entrepreneur, author, public speaker, mentor and former TV personality and hairdresser.

Rachael has written 10 books (9 self-published and 1 published) since 2006, which have sold over 7 million copies.

== Books ==
Rachael's first book Read My Lips was written with co-authors Cyndi O'Meara, Jodie McIver, Fleur Whelligan, Kim Morrison, and Allison Mooney, and released 14 February 2006. Rachael's second book 4 Ingredients was co-written with Kim McCosker (Turnbull), as were the following books within the series, 4 Ingredients 2, 4 Ingredients Gluten Free, "4 Ingredients Fast, Fresh & Healthy" and "4 Ingredients Kids". Rachael and Kim celebrated their first title being named bestselling title of 2008 (it was 2nd bestselling title to JK Rowling's Harry Potter and the Deathly Hallows in 2007 the year of its release).

In 2010, Rachael launched a book publishing and education company Bermingham Books which provides services such as writing mentoring, self-publishing consulting, book publishing, book design, book editing, book promotion. It publishes around 50 books a year, focusing on Australian authors.

In 2011, Bermingham sold her 50% stake in the 4 Ingredients franchise to co-founder Kim McCosker. Bermingham also divorced her husband around the same time. The following year, Bermingham released her eighth book "Savvy" ingredients for success—a motivational book for women wanting to build a business from home around their family commitments. In the following years, Rachael stopped travelling and left the public eye to raise her three boys, write, mentor and develop her book production company. Bermingham released two books in 2017: How to Write Your Book and How to Market Your Book, and has ghostwritten several since.

== Television ==
Bermingham was nominated for best female TV presenter in the 2014 Astra Awards, has also previously appeared on the TV show 4 Ingredients, which aired in 23 countries, including Australia, Africa, UK and New Zealand. She also did a weekly stint on Channel 9's Today Show until exiting from media life to spend time raising her boys and focusing on her publishing company Bermingham Books and community interests.

== Personal life ==
Rachael lives on Australia's Sunshine Coast and has three sons, with her two youngest being a set of twins. She surfs as a hobby.
