= La cuisine pour tous =

French cookbook

La cuisine pour tous, Je sais cuisiner, The French Pocket Cookbook, or I Know How to Cook is a French cookbook edited by Ginette Mathiot and H. Delage.

Originally published in 1932 as Je sais cuisiner ("par Un groupe de cordons bleus, sous la direction de Mlles H. Delage et G. Mathiot, professeurs d'enseignement ménager à la ville de Paris. Près de 2000 recettes de plats exquis, de recettes simples, de conseils rationnels, de données d'hygiène alimentaire, d'économies facilement réalisables"), it has been updated numerous times (both during and after Mathiot's life); a new edition appeared in 1950: "par un groupe de cordons bleus. Sous la direction de Mlle H. Delage,... et de Mlle G. Mathiot,... Nouvelle édition. Près de 2 000 recettes...", Albin Michel. In 1955 it was reissued by the same publisher as La cuisine pour tous and then reprinted by Le Livre de Poche in 1963. It was retitled Je sais cuisiner in 2002. It was first translated into English in 1965 as The French Pocket Cookbook (translation by E. B. Hennessy), and then again in 2009 as I Know How to Cook.

The publisher claims it to be the best-selling home cookbook in France.

The book's style is concise and tightly packed, with some editions containing more than 2,000 recipes found in the French kitchen. It contains separate sections on nutrition, menu planning, and regional and international recipes. It also has companion volumes, including La Pâtisserie pour tous, which covers French pastry in greater depth and Je sais cuisiner autour du monde, which is a collection of international recipes.
