= Margareta Elzberg's cookbook =

Early Swedish cookbook

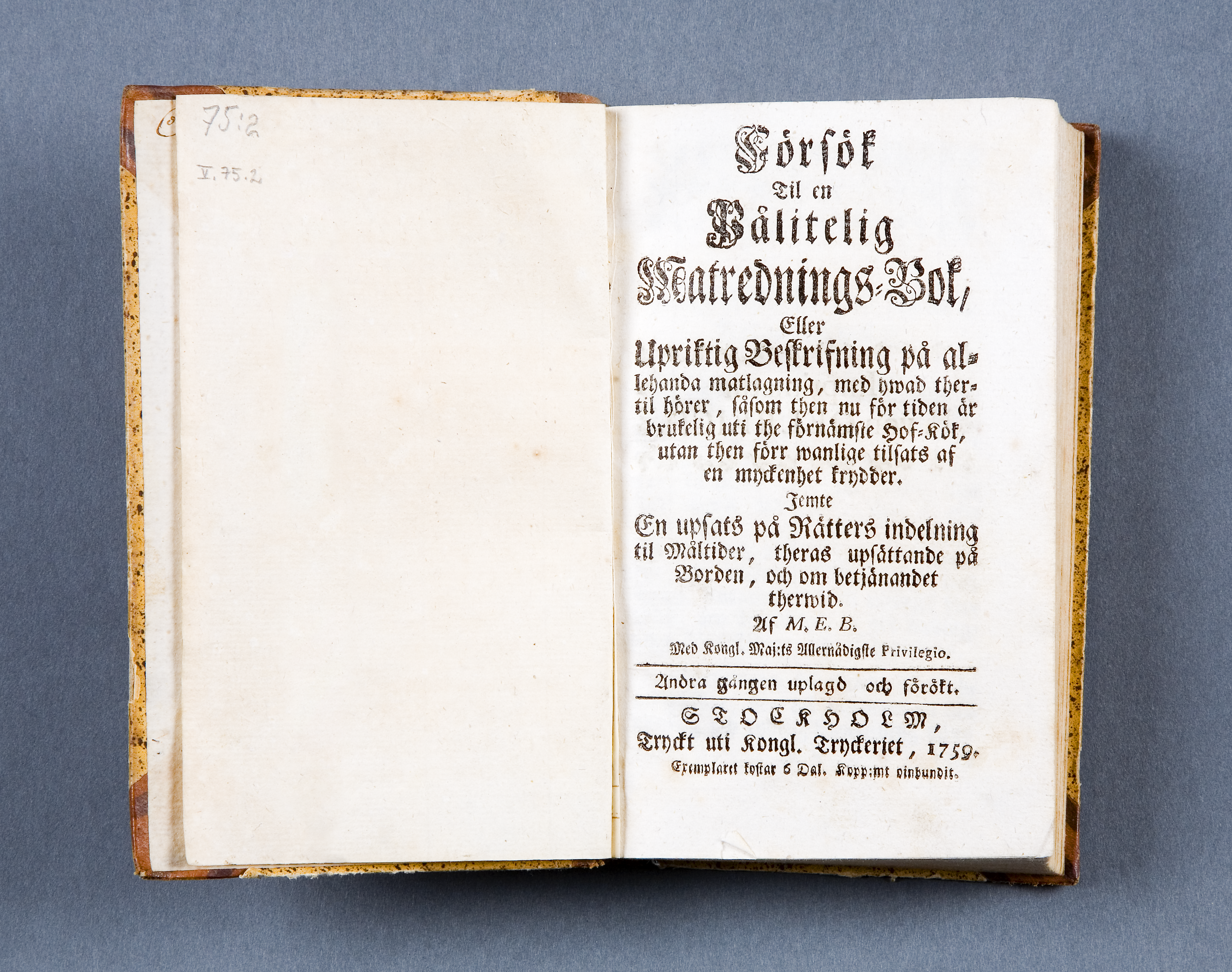
Title page of the 1759 edition

Margareta (Maria) Elzberg was a Swedish domestic servant or housekeeper who published the early Swedish cookbook: An Attempt at a Reliable Book on Food Preparation (Swedish: Försök Til en Pålitelig Matrednings-Bok) in 1751. The full title page reads (translated): (Note: Original Swedish text: "Försök til en pålitelig matrednings-bok, eller Upriktig beskrifning på allehanda matlagning, med hwad thertil hörer, såsom then nu för tiden är brukelig uti the förnämste hof-kök, utan then förr wanlige tilsatts af en myckenhet krydder. Jemte en upsats på rätters indelning til måltider, theras upsättande på borden, och om betjänandet therwid. Af M.E.B. Stockholm, tryckt uti kongl. tryckeriet, 1751") "An Attempt at a Reliable Book on Food Preparation, or Detailed description how to prepared foods of all kinds with everything needed for the purpose such as what is required for the finest kitchens, including many herbs and spices. With a section on serving dishes, on how to display food on the table, and on the role of servants. By M.E.B. Stockholm, printed at the royal printing works, 1751."

== Authenticity ==
In I Hagdahls smak, published in 2009 to commemorate the 200th anniversary of the Swedish chef Charles Emil Hagdahl, Inga Wallenquist explains that Elzberg's recipes were far more authentically Swedish than those included in Susanna Egerin's En nödig och nyttig hus-hålds och kokbok (A Necessary and Useful Housekeeping and Cookery Book) published in 1733, which were based on the cuisine of her native Germany.

The work is therefore firmly Swedish although it has not escaped German and French influences. Working as a housekeeper in an affluent household, in addition to recipes, Elzberg included in her book a section on how meals are to be divided up into courses, as well as instructions to servants on how dishes are to be served.

== Identity of the writer ==
Little is known of Elzberg's life. It is possible the name Margareta Elzberg has simply been used by the author as a pen name.
