= Karen Splid Møller =

Norwegian cookbook writer

Karen Splid Møller (1800–1880) was a Norwegian cookbook writer who is remembered for the handwritten cookbook which she began to compile in 1819, making it one of the oldest sources of Norwegian recipes. It consists mainly of recipes for desserts, cakes and pastries but also includes details for a number of fine hot dishes. As the book was compiled at Moldegård, the house where she lived in Molde in the northernmost part of Western Norway, it is known as kokebok fra Moldegård or the Moldegård Cookbook.

== Biography ==
Møller was born in Molde in 1800, the daughter of Jens Worm Møller (1773–1813) and his wife Louise Augusta née Baade (1778–1813). She was 13 years old when both her parents died within a few months of each other. In September 1820, she married Peder Jalles Øwre (1788–1851) who from 1818 was the first pharmacist in Ålesund. They had four children.

The cookbook was rediscovered in 2005. After Møller's death in 1880, it had come into the hands of Møller's fourth child, Jensine Wilhelmine, who together with her husband Christian Johnsen lived in Villa Retiro in Molde. It remained in the house which was owned by the family and their offspring. Mette Johnsen Bonne sold it in 2005. The same year, she donated the cookbook and other artefacts to the nearby Romsdal Museum.

The cookbook is of special interest as it predates Maren Elisabeth Bang's Huusholdnings-Bog, indrettet efter den almindelige Brug i Norske Huusholdninger, published in 1831. Møller's book originally consisted of over 260 pages but some have been torn out, leaving only 192. It consists of 74 recipes and two sets of instructions for making clothes. There are 52 cake and pastry recipes, 14 for desserts, five for hot dishes and soups, two for biscuits and one for brine.

Karen Splid Møller died in December 1880 in Ålesund where she is buried.
