= Miral (name) =

Miral is a surname and a unisex given name. Notable people with the name include:

== People ==
- Miral Samardžić (born 1987), Slovenian football player
- Miral al-Tahawy (born 1968), Egyptian novelist

== Fictional characters ==
- Miral, main character in the 2010 French film Miral
- Marthe Miral, fictional Francophone author
