= Beatrice A. Vieyra =

Beatrice A. Vieyra wrote a cookbook with Anglo-Indian recipes at the start of the twentieth century. She was a cookbook writer with practical ideas about how to combine British tastes and eating habits with local ingredients. Her book Culinary art sparklets: a treatise on general household information and practical recipes for cooking in all its branches (Madras: Vest, 1915) has recipes that blend local spices with simple everyday dishes such as hard-boiled eggs. A list of spices in her recipes includes curry powder, red pepper, chutneys and lime juice, which is used instead of lemons, and local fruits include mangoes. Her book was dedicated to Lady Pentland on the occasion of her visit to Travancore, a state in India.

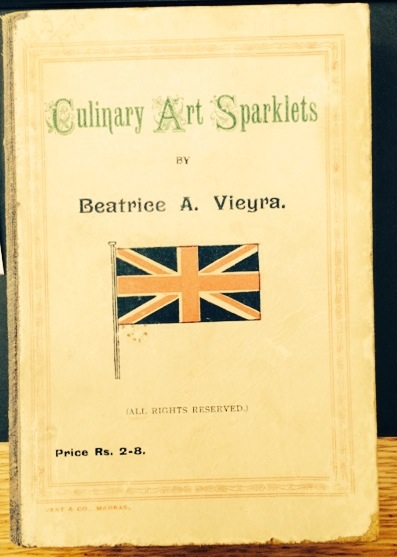
Beatrice Vieyra's book cover

Her recipes have been cited by historian David Burton in his study of food habits The Raj at table: a culinary history of the British India (London: Faber and Faber, 1993) and by Helen Saberi and David Burnett in their book The road to Vindaloo.
