= Simona Lazăr =

Romanian poet, writer, journalist and food critic

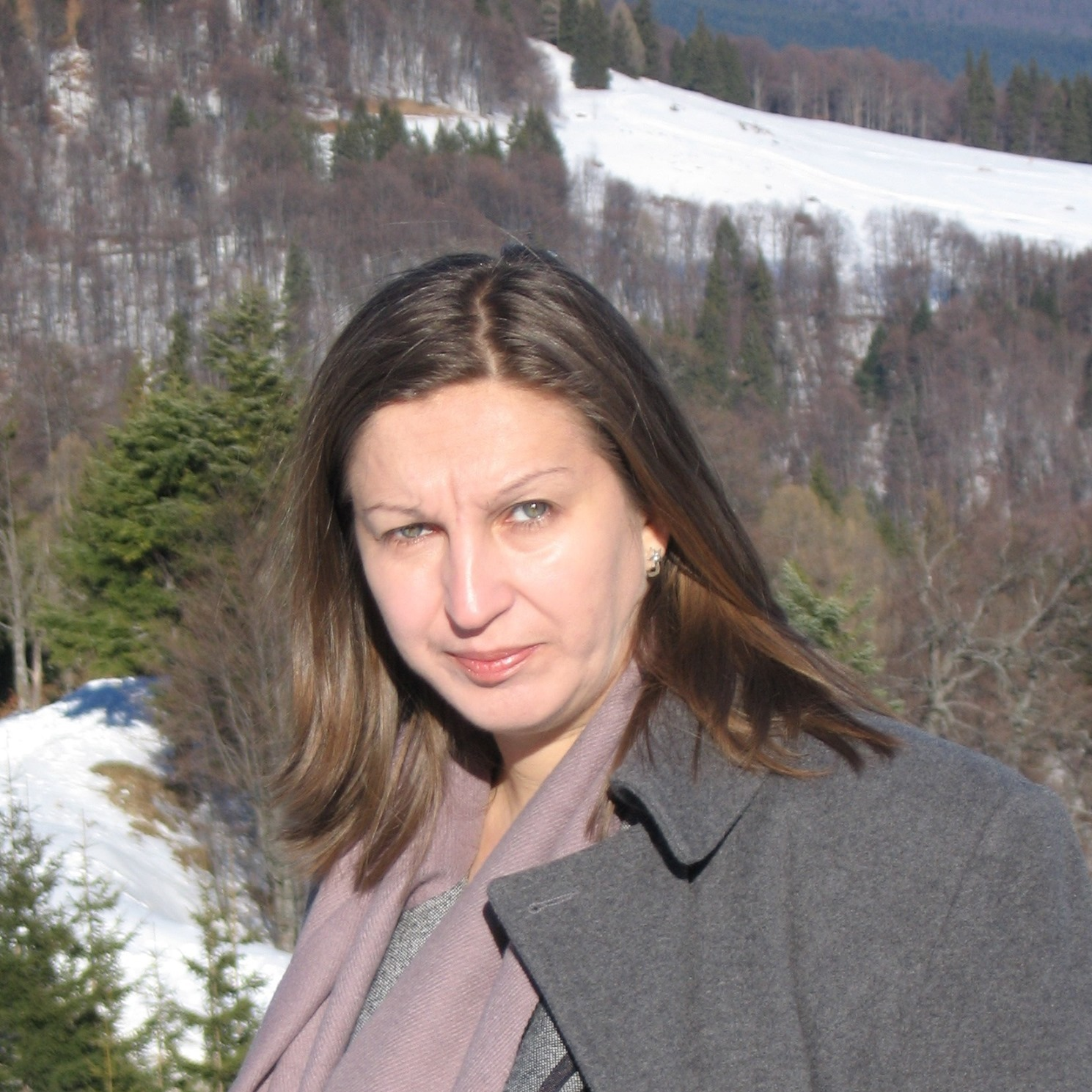

Simona Nicoleta Lazăr is a Romanian poet, writer, journalist, food critic, gastronom, publisher and author of cookbooks. She is a member of the Union of Professional Journalists of Romania (UZP) and of the Association of Journalists and Writers of Tourism of Romania (AJTR). She is married to journalist Valentin Țigău. Her press name is Simona Lazăr while her civil name is Simona Nicoleta Țigău.

== Education ==
The secondary and high school courses follow in Bacău (School no. 5 "Alexandru cel Bun", School no. 16 "Alecu Russo" (1983), Economic and Administrative Law High School (1987) – today "Ion Ghica Economic College" "Bacău). She studied at the Economic University College of the Valahia University in Târgoviște, graduating with the profile of Library and Archive with a thesis on the "Localia" and "Personalia" Funds of the libraries (2003). She continued her studies at the Faculty of Letters of the University of Bucharest,

the Department of Information and Documentation Sciences, with a thesis on the topic "Contributions to the history of Romanian cookbooks from the 19th century, in the European context" (2019). She is a master of the Faculty of Letters of the University of Bucharest, the program "Information Management in the Contemporary Society".

== Books ==
- Somnul grifonului (poems, Deșteptarea, 1996) – ISBN 973-96723-8-8 (The griffin's sleep)
- Iarba manuscriselor (poems, Plumb, 1997) – ISBN 973-9150-87-X (Grass of manuscripts)
- Corabie spre Magonia (poems, Semne, 1998) – ISBN 973-9318-77-0 (Caravel to Magonia)
- Toamnă în Casiopeea (poems, Ager, 2004) – ISBN 973-7961-19-6 (Autumn in Casiopeea)
- Cărticică folositoare (Intact, 2005) – ISBN 973-0-04150-4 (Helpful little book)
- Maria Maurer. Carte de bucate (Jurnalul, 2006) ISBN 973-87854-6-4 (Maria Maurer. Cookery book)
- Rețete de Paști (Jurnalul, 2007) – ISBN 978-973-87854-9-6 (Easter recipes)
- Rețete alese pentru post și Crăciun (Jurnalul, 2010) – ISBN 978-606-8239-04-0 (Recipes chosen for fasting and Christmas)
- Constantin Bacalbașa. Dictatura gastronomică. 1501 feluri de mâncări (Cartex, 2009) – ISBN 978-606-8023-06-9 (Constantin Bacalbașa. Gastronomic dictatorship. 1501 dishes)
- Christ Ionnin. Bucătăria română. 1865 (GastroArt, 2018) – ISBN 978-606-9459-50-8 (Christ Ionnin. Romanian cuisine. 1865)
- Christ Ionnin. Bucătăria română. 1865 (3rd edition, GastroArt, 2019) (Christ Ionnin. Romanian cuisine. 1865)
- Maria Maurer. Carte de bucate. 1849 (GastroArt, 2019) (Maria Maurer. Cookery book. 1849)
- J.C. Hințescu. Bucătăreasa națională. 1874 (GastroArt, 2019) (J.C. Hinţescu. The national lady cook. 1874)
- Constantin Bacalbașa. Rețete interbelice (GastroArt, 2019) (Constantin Bacalbașa. Interwar recipes)

She prefaced the books:

- "Culinary recipes from Turda", Dana Deac, reDiscover publishing house, Cluj Napoca, 2005 – ISBN 973-87349-9-1
- "Useful book"/"Cărticica folositoare" (reprinting the first book of domestic economy published in Bucharest, in 1806), Jurnalul Publishing House, Bucharest, 2005 – ISBN 973-0-04150-4
- "Cookbook. 190 recipes chosen and tried by a friend of all the women of the housewives", by Maria Maurer (reprinting the first cookbook printed in the Romanian Country, in 1849, in Bucharest), Jurnalul Publishing House, Bucharest, 2006 – ISBN 973-87854-6-4
- "Our dishes. Books with more or less Romanian preparations", Horia Vîrlan, NOI Publishing House – Mediaprint, Bucharest, 2009 – ISBN 978-973-1805-56-6
- "77 Stories and recipes from the Golden Age", Veronica Bectaș, Cartex Publishing House, Bucharest, 2010 – ISBN 978-606-8023-10-6
- She curated the newest edition of Radu Anton Roman's cookbook, which appeared in a new format, illustrated and revised, under the title "Stories of Romanian Cuisine" (7 volumes, Jurnalul Publishing House and Paideia Publishing House, 2010). In this new series, the preface to volume II is signed by Simona Lazăr – ISBN 978-606-92051-5-0

== Awards ==
- AJTR 2009 Prize (Association of Journalists and Tourism Writers of Romania) for the neat and annotated edition of the volume "Gastronomic dictatorship. 1501 dishes" by Constantin Bacalbașa, Cartex Publishing, 2009.
- ANBCT 2009 Prize (National Association) of Cooks and Confectioners from Tourism) for the well-edited and annotated edition of the volume "Gastronomic dictatorship. 1501 dishes" by Constantin Bacalbașa, Cartex Publishing House, 2009.
- AJTR 2009 Award for Reporting (Association of Journalists and Tourism Writers of Romania) for articles published in the National Journal, the Kitchen Journal and the Travel Journal. She is nominated for the Tourism Press Club of FIJET Romania Award for 2009, for the articles in the Travel Journal.
- AJTR 2010 Award (Association of Tourism Journalists and Writers of Romania) for coordinating the 7 volumes from "The Stories of Romanian Cuisine" by Radu Anton Roman (illustrated edition), Jurnalul Publishing House & Paideia Publishing House, 2010.
- AJTR 2013 Award for setting up and supporting the online publication "Tourism Press" – www.presadeturism.ro – the official site of the Association of Journalists and Tourism Writers of Romania (AJTR).
- AJTR 2015 Award, for the original concept of the show "Salt in the kitchen", the first "radio culinary show" in Romania.
- The Award of Excellence in Journalism at the Gala of the Union of Professional Journalists of Romania for 2015, the jury thus motivating the award given: “The guests of Simona Nicoleta Lazar always surprise by a reversal of the conveniences. Listening to them, you cannot miss a gymnastics exercise of the mind. I have watched it in countless radio editions and I have never been able to decode that magic ritual by which it manages to cause its interlocutor to release the unspoken thoughts until then. Her shows have great merit that make you listen. To accept. Think and talk. Simona Nicoleta Lazăr – the prize for excellence in journalism for the rediscovery and popularization of the spiritual, traditional and identity treasure of the Romanian village.”
- AJTR 2017, granted for the program "Holiday Ticket" from Romanian Radio Antena Satelor Broadcast.
