= Amy Schauer =

Australian cookery instructor and author (1871-1956)

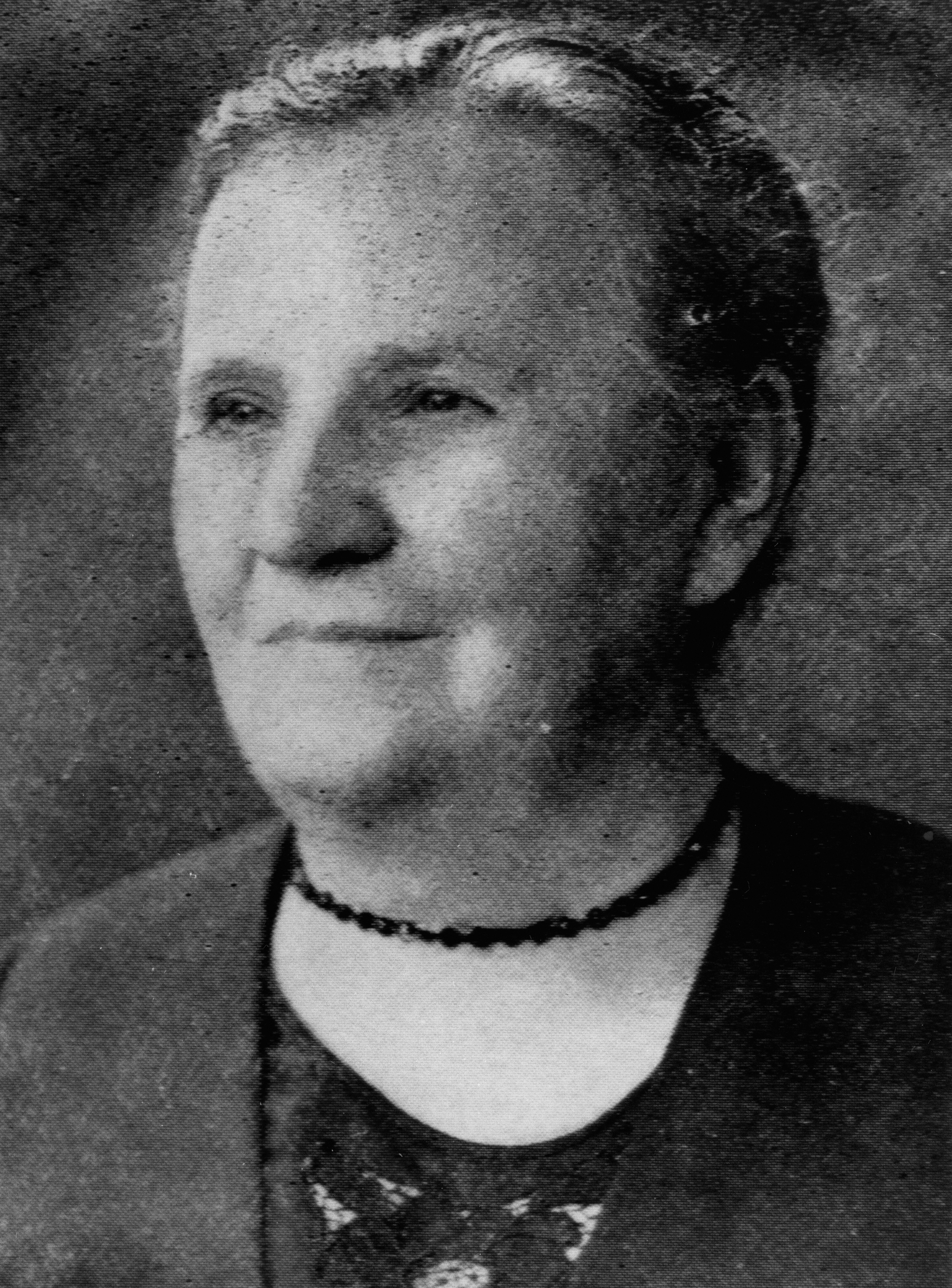
- Born: 2 June 1871
- Died: 13 August 1956 (aged 85)

Amy Schauer (2 June 1871– 13 August 1956) was an Australian cookery instructor and author.

== Biography ==
Amy Schauer was born on 2 June 1871 in Sydney, New South Wales, Australia. After completing her schooling in New South Wales, she took training in domestic sciences at Sydney Technical College. She later joined the Brisbane Technical College, and taught cookery from 1895 until 1922.

She also taught at Nambour Rural School. She, as Ryan claims, became “an outstanding influence on the education of Queensland girls.” Her recipes regularly appeared in magazines including Sapford's Queensland Almanac and the Queensland Farmer's Gazette.

She died at Strathfield, Sydney, on 13 August 1956.

== Publications ==
Her cookbooks were widely used in academic institutions as well as in homes. Her popular books include

- The Schauer Australian Cookery Book ,
- Cookery for Invalids,
- Theory of Cookery, and
- The Schauer Australian Fruit Preserving Recipe Book.
