= Anna Ciundziewicka =

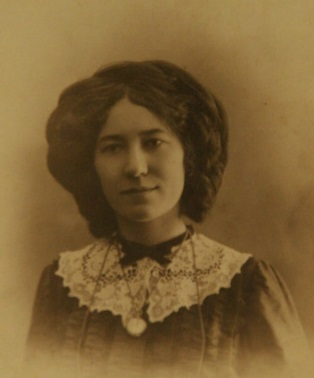
- Born: 18 July 1803; Karališčavičy, Igumensky Uyezd, Minsk Governorate, Russian Empire
- Died: 18 April 1850 (aged 46); Kiščyna Słabada, Minsk Governorate, Russian Empire
- Occupation: Writer
- Writing career
- Genre: Household advice

Anna Ciundziewicka (née Prószyński; 18 July 1803 – 18 April 1850) was an early household and recipe advice writer of Polish ethnicity. She wrote "The Housekeeper of Lithuania" (Gospodyni litewska) in the Polish language.

== Life ==
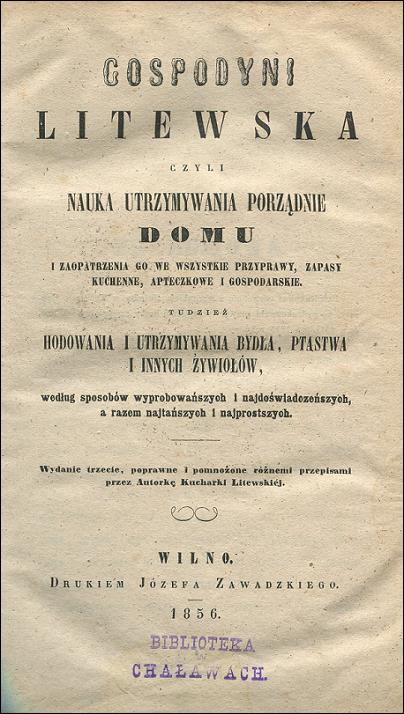
Gospodyni litewska (1856 edition)

Ciundziewicka was born into a well-off family in Karališčavičy, in 1803. She was the daughter of Michał Prószyński of the Ogończyk coat of arms, subcamerarius of Minsk, and Tekla née Wolański. Her sister Michalina married Hipolit Siemiradzki; their son was the painter Henryk Siemiradzki.

She was educated at a boarding school in Vilnius. In 1826, she married into the Ciundziewicki family. Her new family ran a large farm in the village of Kiščyna Słabada and she gathered information about it.

In 1848 she published "The Housekeeper of Lithuania" (Gospodyni litewska) in Vilnius.

She died in 1850, and was buried at her family's chapel.
