= Margo Oliver =

Canadian cookery expert

Margo Oliver (1923 – 4 June 2010) was a Canadian cookery expert. She was the food editor of Weekend Magazine and wrote a number of cookbooks as well as articles on the subject of cooking.

== Early life and education ==
Oliver was born and grew up in Winnipeg, Manitoba. She worked wrapping parcels at Eaton's department store. She took a business course and for a short time worked as a legal secretary. In 1950, she earned an undergraduate degree in home economics from the University of Manitoba, followed by a year of graduate work at the University of Minnesota.

== Career ==
Oliver worked for General Mills in the Betty Crocker Kitchens in Minneapolis. She became Canada's first "Betty Crocker" after General Mills expanded its operations into Canada. As "Betty Crocker", she spent four years traveling throughout Canada, appearing on radio and television, speaking to groups and giving cooking demonstrations.

She joined the staff of the (now defunct) Montreal Standard newspaper in 1959 as food editor of the weekend newspaper supplement, Weekend Magazine, and its successor Today, until 1982 when Today ceased publication. At her behest, the Standard built a proper test kitchen for her where she tested recipes for her columns in Weekend Magazine and Today. During her time with Weekend Magazine, she married Victor Morgan.

Many of Oliver's recipes were reprinted and reviewed in newspapers and magazines. In 1993, she was inducted into the Hall of Fame of the Ontario Home Economists in Business (OHEIB).

Oliver died in June 2010 in Fergus, Ontario.

== Writings on cooking ==
Many obituaries published immediately after her death incorrectly stated that she wrote seven cookbooks, as does the article in the OHEIB Hall of Fame.

=== In English ===
During her time at Weekend Magazine and Today, Margo Oliver published approximately 10,000 recipes in the two, as well as five cookbooks plus several more ephemeral publications. (Many of the recipes originally published in Weekend Magazine and Today reappeared in these cookbooks.) Later, she published a further three cookbooks.

- Weekend Magazine Cookbook, Montreal Standard Publishing (Montreal), 1967; softcover reprint, Totem (Don Mills, Ontario), 1977, ISBN 978-0-00-211632-9
- Weekend Magazine Menu Cookbook, Montreal Standard Publishing (Montreal), 1972, ISBN 978-0-88890-004-3; softcover reprint, Optimum Publishing (Montreal), 1989, ISBN 978-0-88890-163-7
- Stew and Casserole Cookbook, Optimum Publishing (Montreal), 1975, ISBN 978-0-88890-034-0
- Most Treasured Recipes, Optimum Publishing (Montreal), 1977, OCLC 15829534
- Great Entertainers, Health and Welfare Canada (Ottawa), 1980; reprinted, Alberta Alcohol and Drug Abuse Commission (Edmonton, Alberta), 1991, ISBN 978-1-55006-090-4 and later on line.
- Weekend Magazine Cooking School, Weekend Magazine (Montreal?), 1981; Twenty Lessons About Basic Cooking and Baking Techniques plus Twenty-eight Additional Lessons About Basic Cooking and Baking Techniques
- Cooking for Today, Today Magazine Inc (Toronto), 1982, ISBN 978-0-88923-000-2
- Cookbook for Seniors, International Self-Counsel Press (North Vancouver, BC), 1989, ISBN 978-0-88908-695-1
- Good Food for One, International Self-Counsel Press (North Vancouver, BC), 1990, ISBN 978-0-88908-889-4
- Classical Canadian Recipes, Optimum Publishing (Montreal), 1993, ISBN 978-0-88890-235-1; this was also printed Classical American Recipes, Great Pond Publishing (Stowe, Vermont), 1993, ISBN 978-0-88890-236-8 and The Good Food Cookbook, Tormont Publishing (Montreal), 1993, ISBN 978-2-89429-379-9 (a shortened version)

=== In French ===
Several of Margo Oliver's cookbooks also appeared in French:

- Perspectives Les Menus, Montreal Standard Publishing (Montréal), 1972, ISBN 978-0-88890-005-0
- Cuisine Pour Tous Les Jours, Editions Optimum Limitée (Montréal), 1975, ISBN 978-0-88890-038-8
- Oliver, Margo (1977). Cuisine de choix de Margo Oliver. Montréal: Editions Optimum. ISBN 0-88890-068-6. OCLC 15854797.
- La Bonne Cuisine, HB & Cie Editeurs (Montréal), 1992, ISBN 978-2-9803258-0-9
