= Indonesian Cooking =

2012 cookbook by Dina Yuen

Indonesian Cooking: Satays, Sambals and More
- Indonesian Cooking cover
- Author: Dina Yuen
- Language: English
- Subject: Indonesian cuisine
- Genre: Cookbook
- Publisher: Tuttle Publishing
- Publication date: 10 March 2012
- Media type: Print (hardback and paperback)
- Pages: 120
- ISBN: 978-0-8048-4145-0
- OCLC: 849816927
- Dewey Decimal: 641.59598
- LC Class: TX724.5.I5 Y84 2019
- Website: Official website at the Wayback Machine (archived 26 June 2012)

Indonesian Cooking: Satays, Sambals and More is a cookbook about Indonesian cuisine by the businesswoman and chef Dina Yuen. It was published in 2012 by Tuttle Publishing.

== Author's background ==
Dina Yuen, a Chinese-Russian businesswoman and chef, wrote the cookbook with the aim of having it accessible to everyone interested in using its recipes. When she was 12 years old, Yuen began living in Jakarta, Indonesia. Indonesian Cooking is inspired by the Indonesian culinary knowledge Yuen acquired while living there. At the end of her teenage years, Yuen relocated to the United States. Yuen began working on The Shanghai Legacy, a historical fiction novel that explores her Chinese and Russian roots. She is the founder and CEO of Asian Fusion, a website that discusses topics for different Asian countries such as travel, food, and culture.

Yuen is a food and travel critic, a skincare expert and a speaker on travel, Asian and women's issues. In 2015, she was the Keynote Speaker at the Women In Travel Summit in Boston. Yuen has been a longtime supporter of orphaned and abused children in Asia, working with various organizations, particularly those focused on rescuing children forced into prostitution. She is an industrial engineer and classical musician by education.

== Overview ==
Published by Tuttle Publishing, Indonesian Cooking has 81 recipes covering food from East Java, West Java, Bali and other regions of the country. The book provides instructions for making terong balado sauce, oxtail soup, coconut noodle chicken laksa, garlic rice stew, nasi goreng, gado-gado, satay, and chicken and potato croquettes. (Note: For terong balado sauce, gado-gado, and satay; For oxtail soup; For coconut noodle chicken laksa; For chicken and potato croquettes; For nasi goreng and garlic rice stew) It offers suggestions for how to prepare food such as how to properly fry noodles and rice, a suitable way to stockpile herbs so they can be used much later, and why a mortar and pestle are good tools to use. The book's focus is home cooking, so its recipes minimise the number of ingredients needed and avoid complexity.

It discusses how Bali residents are accustomed to eating "sweet and mildly spicy roasted meats" and the East Java inhabitants enjoy eating mocha cakes and masakan jawa, a spicy salad. The book focuses on West Java's Betawi cuisine and Sundanese cuisine. She discusses how desserts are likely to use natural products rather than non-natural ones owing to what Indonesians favour. These include iced green coconut, coconut milk with sweet potatoes, and Dutch-Indo crêpes made with palm sugar.

== Reception ==
Calling Indonesian Cooking a "fascinating new cookbook", Athens Banner-Herald's Linda Cicero wrote that the author "gives a great introduction to Indonesian cooking while also making it easy to find what you need in Western markets". Manote Tripathi praised the book in The Nation, writing, "The dishes in the book range from the familiar to the exotic. Yuen offers easy-to-follow recipes to introduce each of these dishes that celebrate the use of organic products, fresh herbs and spices. The dishes laid out in this book reflect the breadth and depth of Indonesia’s vast culinary culture."
