= Barbara Massaad =

Lebanese-American food personality

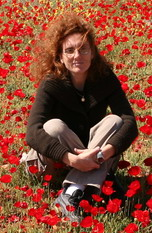
- Massaad in a field of poppies in Akkar District
- Born: Barbara Abdeni Massaad; March 15, 1970 (age 55); Beirut, Lebanon
- Occupations: Author, photographer, food consultant, TV host
- Television: Helwi Beirut
- Spouse: Serge Albert Massaad (m. 1995)
- Children: 3
- Website: barbaramassaad.com

Barbara Abdeni Massaad (born March 15, 1970, Beirut) is a Lebanese-American cookbook author, photographer, food consultant, and TV host. She is the author of several cookbooks, including Man’oushé: Inside the Street Corner Lebanese Bakery and Mouneh: Preserving Foods for the Lebanese Pantry, which have been translated into French and Arabic, respectively.

== Early life ==
Barbara Abdeni was born in Beirut, Lebanon, but soon emigrated to the United States with her parents. The family settled in Fort Lauderdale, Florida. As a teenager, she gained first culinary experience assisting her father, a photographer by training, in the family-owned Lebanese restaurant. In 1988, she returned to Lebanon to attend university, graduating with a BA degree in Advertising and Marketing.

== Career ==
Massaad trained with chefs at Lebanese, Italian, and French restaurants. In 2006, she joined the Slow Food Movement, an organization which promotes the preservation of local food traditions, biodiversity, and small-scale food production. She is one of the founding members of Slow Food Beirut and a delegate of the international Terra Madre Community. She represented Lebanon in 2007 in the biannual Slow Food Worldwide Congress] in Puebla, Mexico.

In 2012, Massaad wrote Man’oushé: Inside the Street Corner Lebanese Bakery. The book, created in collaboration with Raymond Yazbeck, contains about 70 recipes about Lebanese pies, including typical varieties found in street corner bakeries, but which can also be made at home. Her second book, Mouneh: Preserving Foods for the Lebanese Pantry, includes a selection of recipes, photos and accompanying stories.

Her third book, Mezze: A Labor of Love, illustrated by Pascale Hares, includes recipes for the creation of the traditional Lebanese dish mezze. Massaad hosted a weekly TV segment on Lebanese/International channel LBCI on Helwi Beirut, featuring culinary tours around Lebanon, focusing on local foods, interviewing and cooking with local chefs, producers, housewives and farmers.

After visiting a refugee camp in Syria in 2016, Massaad published another cookbook, Soup for Syria, designating the profits to support refugees. As well as her own recipes, the book contains soup recipes donated by a number of well-known chefs.

== Personal life ==
Massaad lives in Beirut with her husband Serge Massaad and three children.

== Awards and honors ==
- Winner of the Gourmand Cookbook Award 2013
- Winner of “Prix de la Littérature Gastronomique” 2010
- Winner of the Gourmand Cookbook Award 2010
- Winner of the Gourmand Cookbook Award 2008
