= Vanessa Bolosier =

French Caribbean food writer

- Born: Guadeloupe
- Culinary career
- Cooking style: Caribbean cuisine
- Award(s) won: 1 Gold Star Great Taste Award 2013, 1 Gold Star Great Taste Award 2013
- Website: www.vanessabolosier.tumblr.com

Vanessa Bolosier born in Guadeloupe, is a French Caribbean food writer living in London. She's the author of Creole Kitchen published by Pavilion in June 2015.

== Career ==
Vanessa Bolosier grew up in Guadeloupe. After moving from Guadeloupe to France in 2001, Bolosier balanced a social work degree with a career as a fashion model. She moved to London in 2005 and continued her career as commercial model and then as a plus size model. She obtained a MA Publishing at London College of Communication (UAL) and started a career in marketing as a digital producer.

She launched her supperclub in 2012 and subsequently launched her award-winning coconut confectionery brand Coco Gourmand in 2013. The products were stocked in numerous shops including the Great Taste Section in Selfridges, Oxford Street. Her first cookery book Creole Kitchen was released by Pavilion in June 2015 and includes Caribbean recipes inspired by the French Islands of Guadeloupe and Martinique.

== Creole Kitchen ==
Creole Kitchen is Bolosier's first cookery book and was released on 11 June 2015. It is a collection of traditional as well as original recipes inspired by her childhood growing up in Guadeloupe and Martinique. Vanessa learned to cook with her late father Gabin Bolosier, an English teacher who grew up in Martinique and learned to cook with his Amerindian grandmother. The book was republished under the name Sunshine Kitchen in June 2021.

== TV ==
Bolosier has appeared on Mel & Sue (ITV) and on B World Connection (Guadeloupe 1ère)

== Volunteering ==
Bolosier volunteered at domestic violence refuges in France (SOS Femmes) and in the UK (Refuge). She is actively involved in fighting for the end of violence against women and girls. She wrote a dissertation on the impact of group dynamics on the self-esteem of domestic violence survivor as well as facilitated workshops around health, beauty and well-being for the latter group. She frequently volunteers as a guest speakers for young people.
