= Jessica Clark-Bojin =

Canadian producer, pie artist and author

Jessica Leigh Clark-Bojin "ThePieous"
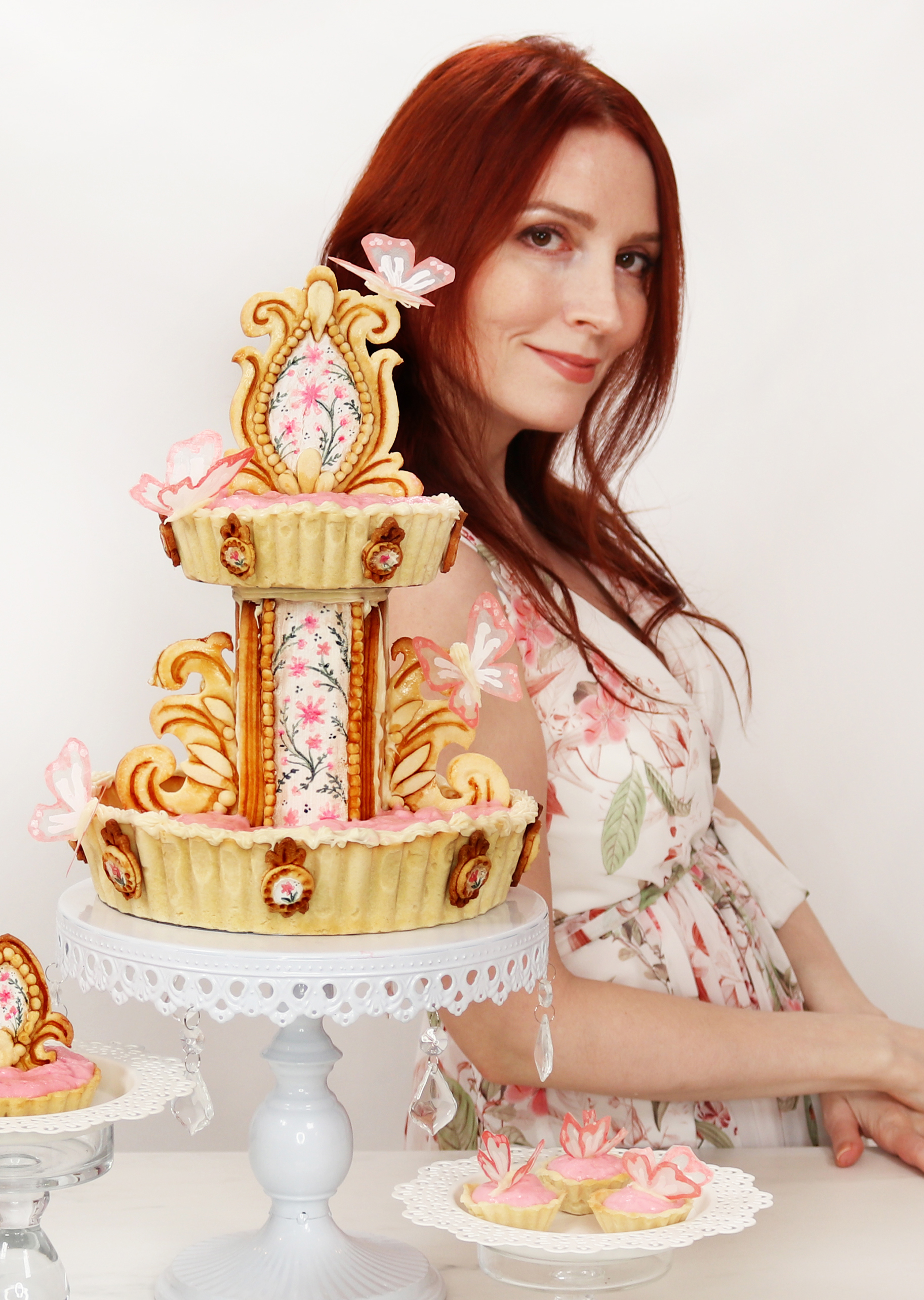
- Photograph of Jessica Leigh Clark-Bojin with one of her "Piescrapers"
- Born: Jessica Leigh Clark-Bojin; Vancouver, British Columbia, Canada
- Website: http://www.PiesAreAwesome.com

Jessica Leigh Clark-Bojin is a pie artist and media producer, credited with the creation of the "Piescraper" and the television series Fun City, for which she is host and producer. She is the author of Pies Are Awesome: The Definitive Pie Art Book with foreword by Duff Goldman, and has appeared as a pie judge on the Food Network and The TODAY Show. Known as "ThePieous" on social media, Clark-Bojin's pie art has been featured in Ripley's Believe it or Not!, People, CNN, Business Insider, Entertainment Tonight, Food & Wine Magazine, as well as front-paging on Reddit.

Prior to her career as a pie artist, Clark-Bojin worked as a filmmaker in Vancouver, British Columbia.

== Biography ==
Clark-Bojin was born in Vancouver, British Columbia. She attended the Emily Carr University of Art + Design, from which she received a Bachelor of Design Degree. She worked in the design and media space, holding positions such as VP Creative for Zeros 2 Heroes Media, Head of Department of the Entertainment Business Management Program at Vancouver Film School, and founding executive of indie film production company Done Four Productions, prior to her work as a pie artist.

== Selected publications and notable works ==
Clark-Bojin's notable works include:

- Her book Pies Are Awesome: The Definitive Pie Art Book, which is an Editor's Pick on Amazon, and has been featured as the cover story in Bake Magazine.
- Her book Pie Modding, which was featured in numerous publications, including BoingBoing, Laughing Squid, and Neatoramma.
- The Kickstarter for her invention "Pie Guides", which was a "Project We Love" on Kickstarter, fully funded in its first hour, and ended at over 1600% funded.
- Her "Death Star pie video" for Food Network, which was viewed 30 million times in its first week online, through Food Network's Facebook page (currently at 36 million views on the Facebook post.)
- Her "Baby Yoda/Grogu" pie, which front paged on Reddit and was the most upvoted post of all time on r/Food for over a year (currently the second most upvoted post).
- Her "Disney Princess pies" series, which was written about in dozens of international publications including Good Housekeeping, Teen Vogue and People Magazine.
- Her "Halloween Pie Series", which has been written about in dozens of international publications, including Bored Panda, Laughing Squid, and Buzzfeed
- Her series of "Celebrity Pietraits" which were featured on CNN, the BBC, the Today Show, and Entertainment Tonight.
- Her feature in Ripley's Believe it or Not! 2019 Annual "Beyond the Bizarre"
- The broadcast television series "Fun City" - a show dedicated to fulfilling childhood dreams as an adult - which she produces and hosts

== Quotations about Clark-Bojin and her work ==
Excerpts from articles and video features on Clark-Bojin and her work:

- People "Bojin wrote on her website that her goal is to prove pies can go up against “the poshest wedding cakes and fancy-pants desserts,” and there’s no doubt she’s doing just that."
- Food & Wine - "Jessica Leigh Clark-Bojin didn't set out to change the world when she began baking towering, vertically-inclined pies. But now, it's only a matter of time before her epic creations take over wedding cake's coveted spot on the buffet table."
- Enchanted Living Magazine - "if pie is indeed home, then pie artist Jessica Clark-Bojin, better known online by her business name ThePieous, would be the baking Gloria Vanderbilt. Just as Vanderbilt brought elegance to home décor, Clark-Bojin brings astonishing feats of artistry and sophistication to the humble pie."
- Houston Chronicle - "Jessica Leigh Clark-Bojin is a master baker whose pies are a delectable combination of art and food."
- CTV News - "If eating is a delight for the senses, then prepare yourself for a visual feast. A Vancouver woman is taking the baking world by storm with pies that look a lot more like fine art works."
