= Hannah Sunderani =

Canadian cookbook author

- Education: McMaster University; Centennial College (Canada)
- Occupations: Cookbook author and blogger
- Writing career
- Subject: Vegan/plant-based cookbooks
- Notable work: The Two Spoons Cookbook: More Than 100 French Inspired Vegan Recipes.
- Website: www.twospoons.ca

Hannah Sunderani is a Canadian vegan/plant-based cookbook author, known for her cookbook and blog, The Two Spoons, which offer "french-inspired" vegan dishes.

== Early life ==
Sunderani was born and raised in Toronto, Canada. She graduated from McMaster University in 2012 with a B.A. in communication, and from Centennial College in 2014 with a post-grad degree from the Public Relations-Corporate Communications program.

== Career ==
Sunderani developed an interest in cooking as a child, and dabbled in vegan cooking during college as a way of coping with IBS. She was initially hesitant to becoming fully vegan, and did not commit until 2016 when she and her husband moved to France. She launched her Two Spoons blog as a way to document vegan cooking while in France. Sunderani notes that she was inspired by what she describes as a "shift happening with traditional French recipes and putting a vegan spin on it," which she discovered after the move. Her goal was to develop an approach to French cooking that demonstrated that "you don’t need the butter. You don’t need the egg."

In 2019 she returned to Toronto, and turned her Two Spoons blog into her job. She published her cookbook in 2022, and it became a bestseller.

== Awards and nominations ==
The Two Spoons: More Than 100 French-Inspired Vegan Recipes is the recipient of the 2023 Taste Canada Sliver Award: Health or Special Diet Cookbooks from the Taste Canada Awards. It was also nominated for an IVFF award in 2022.

== Books ==
- The Two Spoons Cookbook: More Than 100 French Inspired Vegan Recipes. Penguin Random House, 2022. ISBN 978-0-7352-4128-2.
