= Susan Branch =

American writer

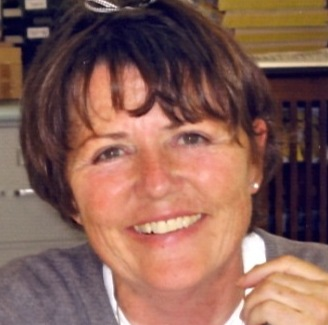
- Born: Susan Anne Stewart; April 12, 1947 (age 79)
- Occupations: Author and illustrator
- Website: www.susanbranch.com

Susan Branch is an American author, watercolorist, and designer. Her works include the Heart of the Home series of cookbooks in which she was also the illustrator.

== Life ==
Born in St. Mary's Hospital in Long Beach, California, she is the eldest of Patricia Louise (Smith) and John Patrick Stewart's eight children. Branch grew up in the San Fernando Valley outside of Los Angeles, California. This is chronicled in her 2015 memoir, The Fairy Tale Girl. Her first commercial success manifested in 1978 at the Red Door Gallery in Beverly Hills, California. In 1982, Branch moved from California to the island of Martha's Vineyard off the coast of Massachusetts, a story told in part-two of her memoir, Martha's Vineyard, Isle of Dreams, published in 2016. In 1986, the first of eleven volumes, Heart of the Home, Notes from a Vineyard Kitchen, was published by Hachette Book Group (then "Little, Brown and Company"). In 1990, Branch's book, Christmas from the Heart of the Home was nominated for the James Beard Award. She lives on Martha's Vineyard with her partner Joe Hall and runs Susan Branch Studios.

Branch's book, A Fine Romance, Falling in Love with the English Countryside (2013), was discussed in an article in Publishers Weekly both for the velocity of its sales (going into 3rd printing) and how an established author has taken risks by choosing a hybrid publishing route. Her latest book, Martha's Vineyard, Isle of Dreams, currently a New York Times Bestseller, was published by her own imprint, Spring Street Publishing. Her entry into self publishing is discussed in a recent article in Publishers Weekly.

== Bibliography ==
- Heart of the Home, Notes from a Vineyard Kitchen (1986)
- Vineyard Seasons (1988)
- Christmas from the Heart of the Home (1990)
- Baby Love (1992)
- Love from the Heart of the Home (1994)
- The Summer Book (1995)
- Christmas Joy (1995)
- Days from the Heart of the Home (1996)
- Sweets to the Sweet (1998)
- Girlfriends Forever (2000)
- Christmas Memories (2001)
- Autumn (2004)
- A Fine Romance, Falling in Love with the English Countryside (2013)
- Fairy Tale Girl (2015)
- Martha's Vineyard, Isle of Dreams (2016)
