= June Hersh =

American author

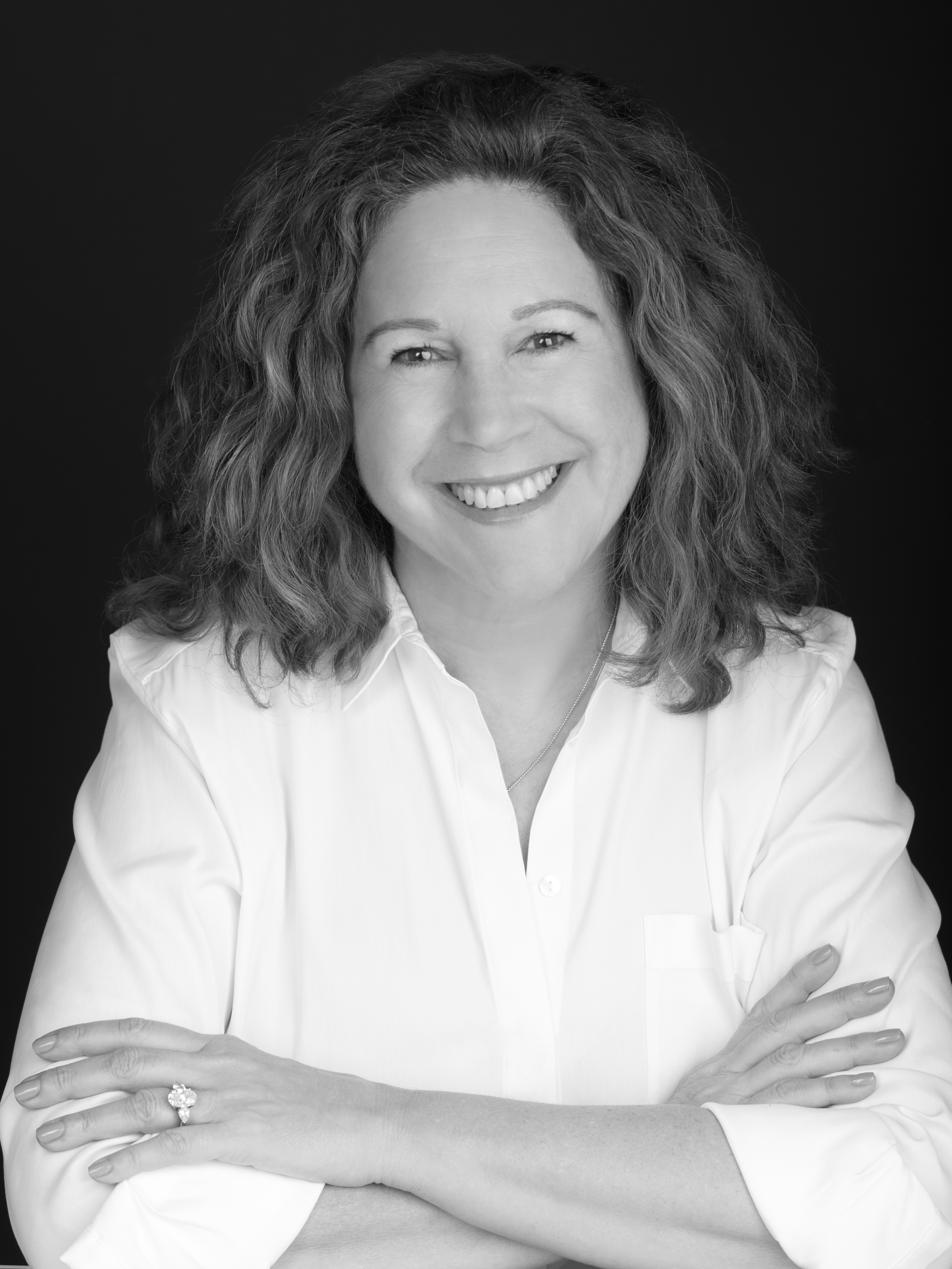
- Occupation: Author
- Known for: Holocaust remembrance and kosher cookbooks
- Spouse: Ronald L. Hersh
- Website: www.junehersh.com

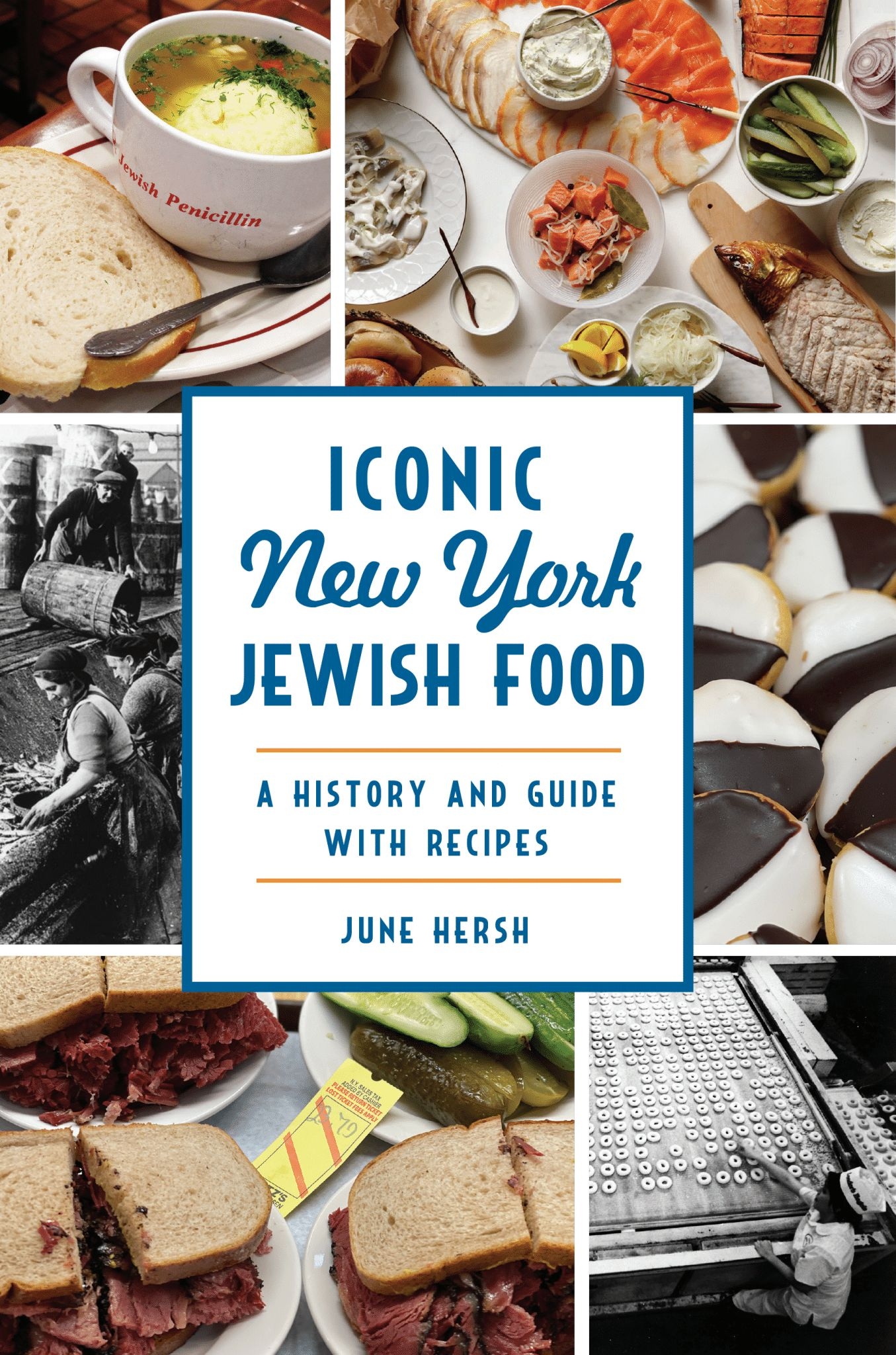

June Hersh is an American author. Her works include Recipes Remembered: A Celebration of Survival, Still Here: Inspiration from Survivors and Liberators of the Holocaust, The Kosher Carnivore: The Ultimate Meat and Poultry Cookbook, Yoghurt a Global History and Iconic New York Jewish Food, a History and Guide with Recipes (the History Press, February 2023.)

== Books ==
Hersh is the author of Recipes Remembered: A Celebration of Survival, which was a collection of recipes from survivors of the Holocaust. In researching the book she interviewed more than 100 survivors and their relatives, in order to derive their “stories, food memories and recipes,” according to the New York Times. It is divided into geographical regions and includes other memories of survival. Hersh added twenty-six additional themed recipes from professional chefs. Parts of the stories from eighty different survivors are included as well. As a part of her work with the book, she hosted sales of the book on QVC.

In 2011 she wrote the book The Kosher Carnivore: The Ultimate Meat and Poultry Cookbook, which focuses on beef, veal, lamb, and poultry dishes that adhere to kosher laws. The recipes also do not use dairy. The book has 120 recipes in all. In 2017 she was the editor for the photographic work Still Here: Inspiration from Survivors and Liberators of the Holocaust. Yoghurt a Global History, a historical look at the world's oldest fermented food was released in the UK in March 2021 by Reaktion Books and in the US by the University of Chicago Press in May 2021. Her newest book, Iconic New York Jewish Foods, a History and Guide with Recipes will be released by American Palate, an imprint of The History Press in February 2023. It is a look at the foods that were brought to America by Jewish immigrants which made their mark on New York's culinary landscape. Of the book, Jake Cohen author of the bestselling book Jew-ish said " As someone whose entire personality is the intersection of New York, Judaism, and food, I cannot be more obsessed with this book and grateful to June for shining a light on the evolution of Jewish food when our community arrived to NYC." James Beard award-winning author Rozanne Gold wrote " With historic photos and alluring anecdotes, this is the culinary memoir of a city, filling and satisfying as a hot potato knish (recipe included). " And Food Network host and James Beard award winner Ellie Krieger agreed "...this beautifully written book fills me with joy and nostalgia, and its in-depth history is absolutely captivating. It’s a tribute to New York’s Jewish food culture, told with heart, soul, and excellent recipes..." Hersh has also appeared on cable news outlets discussing her books. In September 2022, she was inducted into the New York Chapter of Les Dames d' Escoffier an organization that features female luminaries in the food, beverage, and hospitality industries. One of her recipes will be featured in their upcoming book, Stirring the Pot

.

== Personal life ==
She is married to her husband Ronald L. Hersh.
