= Sofia von Porat =

Swedish writer (born 1989)

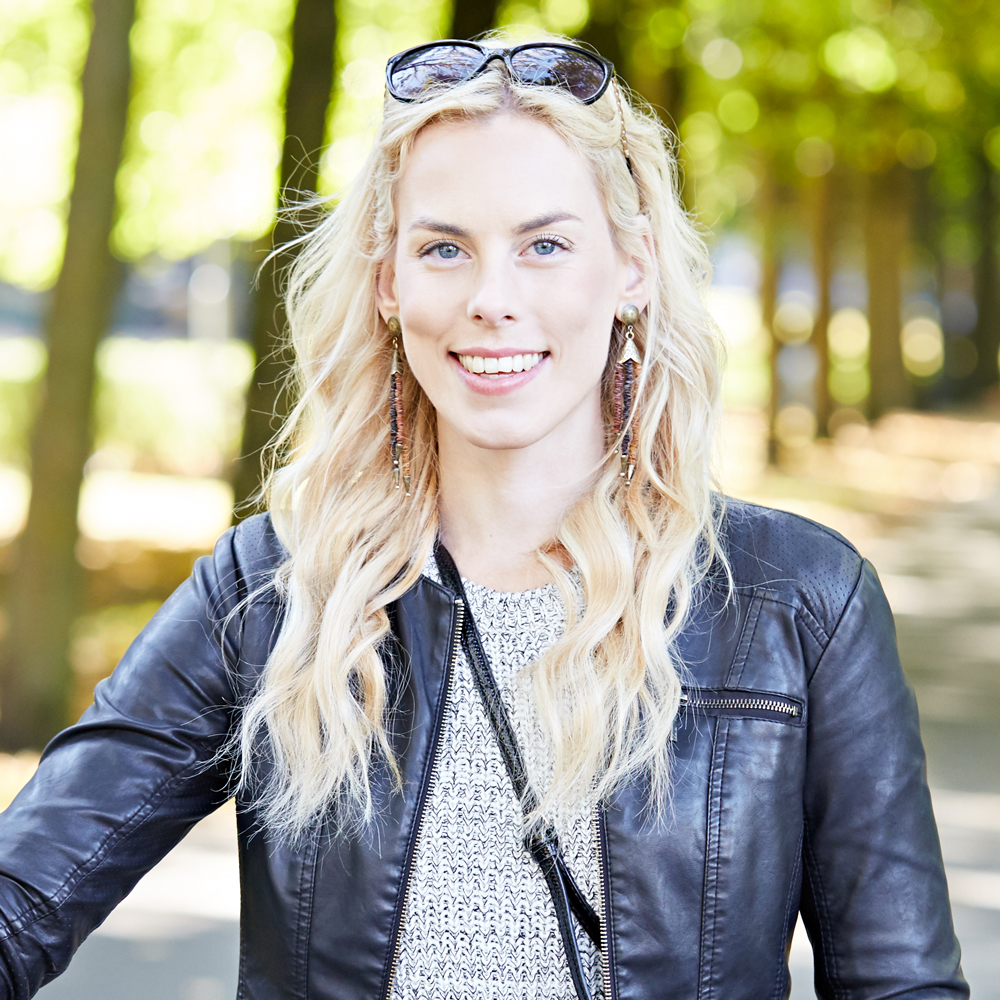
- Born: 25 February 1989 (age 37); Gothenburg, Sweden
- Partner: Nathan Schacherer
- Website: sofiavonporat.com

Sofia von Porat (born February 25, 1989) is a Swedish cookbook author, travel writer and entrepreneur. She blogs about food, vegetarianism and travel. Her debut cookbook "Vego för alla!" was published by Tukan Förlag in 2015.

== Career ==
=== Food author ===
Sofia became interested in cooking while spending five years traveling full-time around the world as a travel writer, where she had the opportunity to explore cuisine from all over the world. In 2015, she published her debut cookbook titled 'Vego för alla!' and her second cookbook 'Vardagsvego för alla!' will be published in December 2016.

Sofia also writes about vegetarian food for the Swedish food magazine and website Mitt kök

== Bibliography ==
- 2015: Vego för alla! : lättlagad grön mat för ett sundare liv
- 2016: Vardagsvego för alla! - snabba och lättlagade vegorecept för vardagen
