= Kate Halford =

English cookbook writer (1862–1938)

Kate Esther Halford (née Hyam; 1862–1938) was an English cookbook author who penned the 365 series of cookbooks published in London in the 1910s. She also co-authored a successful book on Jewish cookery with her younger sister Rose Mabel "May" Henry.

Halford was also the secretary of the Union of Jewish Women, founded in 1902 to help Jewish refugees from the Russian Empire.

She was born in Paddington to Frederick Benjamin Hyam (later Halford), a clothier and insurance agent, and Maria Amelia Jacobs.

== Books ==
- 1907 (co-authored with Mrs May Henry) Dainty Dinners and Dishes for Jewish Families London: Wertheimer, Lea and Co.
- 1909 (co-authored with Alice Model): 365 Vegetarian Dishes: Neither Flesh, Fowl nor Fishes London: Dean and Son
- 1912: 365 Salads and Savouries London: Dean and Son
- 1915: 365 Puddings and Pies London: Dean and Son
