= Bi Skaarup =

Archeologist and food historian

- Born: September 9, 1952; Copenhagen, Denmark
- Died: March 15, 2014 (aged 61); Copenhagen, Denmark
- Occupations: Archeologist, food historian
- Years active: 1984–2014

Bi Skaarup (September 9, 1952, in Copenhagen – March 15, 2014, in Copenhagen) was a Danish archeologist, author, food historian and lecturer. She was employed at Museum of Copenhagen from 1985 to 2006 as curator, and was responsible for parts of the excavations during the construction of Copenhagen Metro and wrote several articles about the subjects.

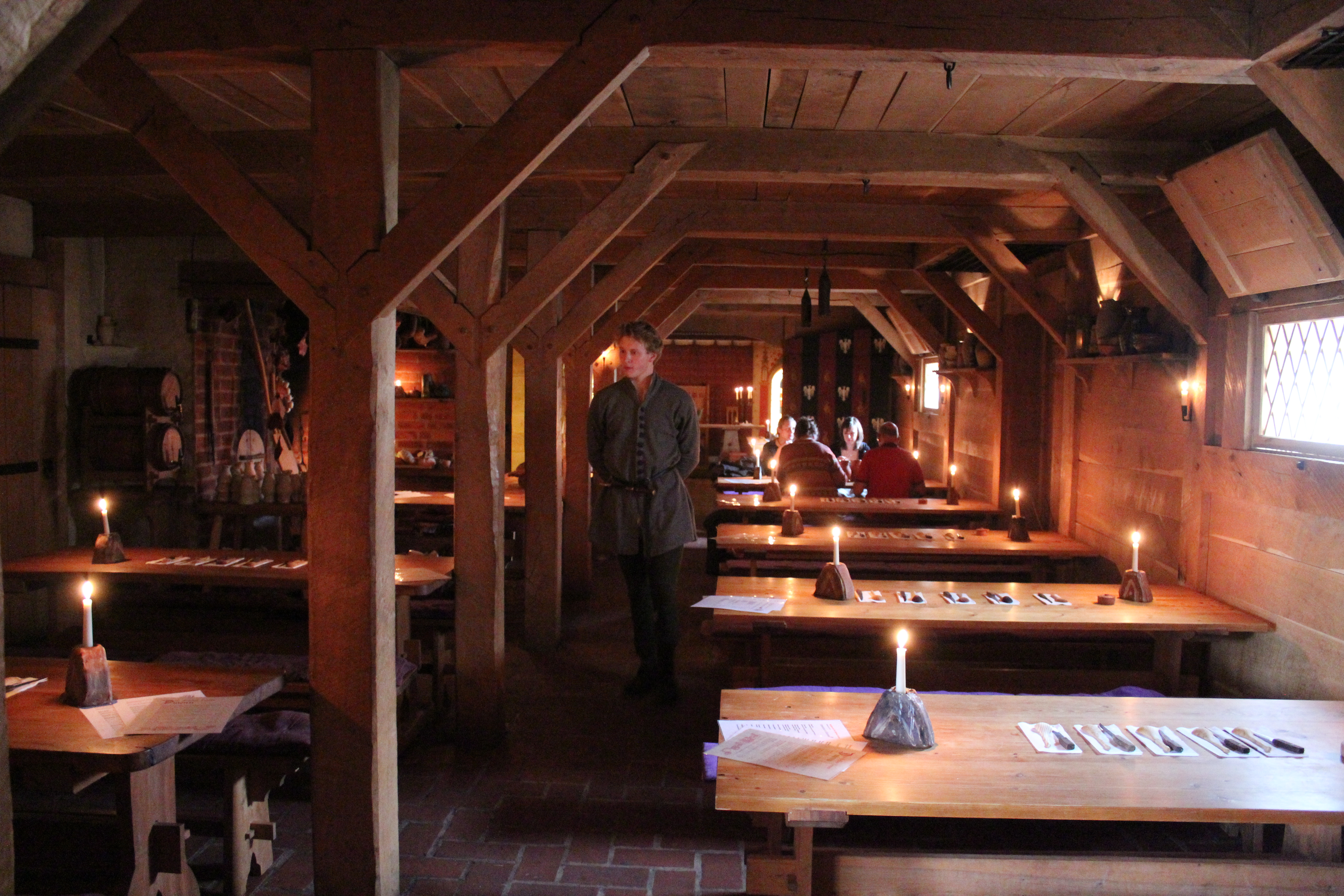
The restaurant The Golden Swan at Middelaldercentret, which Skaarup helped develop.

In 1995–96 she helped to develop the medieval restaurant The Golden Swan at the Danish open-air museum Middelaldercentret at Nykøbing Falster. She worked as a consultant until her death.

In 2006 she moved to Falster with her husband to do courses and lectures in historical cookery.

She wrote multiple cookbooks about historical food, and was appointed president of the Danish Gastronomic Academy, which she became a member of in 1991. She participated in numerous television programs about historical cooking, especially on the Danish television channel dk4 together with the journalist Frantz Howitz. She died in the spring of 2014 after long illness. She was mentioned as a pioneer in her work with the history of food.

== Bibliography ==
=== Books ===
- 1997 Mad og spisevaner fra middelalderen, Middelaldercentret ISBN 87-984133-6-8
- 1999 Middelaldermad. Kulturhistorie, kilder og 99 opskrifter. With Henrik Jacobsen. ISBN 978-87-00-48716-1
- 2006 Renæssancemad. Opskrifter og køkkenhistorie fra Christian 4.'s tid ISBN 978-87-02-04704-2
- 2011 Bag brødet: dansk brød og bagning gennem 6000 år ISBN 978-87-02-11804-9
- 2014 Kongelige Tafler

=== Articles ===
- 1988 "Arkæologiske undersøgelser i København", Københavns Kronik nr. 42, s. 5–8
- 1991 "Gammeltorv – Nytorv", Københavns Kronik nr. 53, s. 3–7
- 1992 "Nyt om Københavns arkæologi", Københavns Kronik nr. 58, s. 8
- 1993 "Nyt om Københavns arkæologi", Københavns Kronik nr. 61, s. 3–4
- 1994 "Soffye", Skalk nr. 5; s. 26–29
- 1995 "Nyt om Københavns arkæologi", Københavns Kronik nr. 67, s. 2–3
- 1997 "1000-års historie under Kongens Nytorv", Københavns Kronik nr. 77, s. 5–9

=== Contributions ===
- Dahl, Bjørn Westerbeek; Skaarup, Bi og Christensen, Peter Thorning; Guide til Københavns Befæstning. 900 års befæstningshistorie, København: Environment- and Ministry of Energy, Danish Nature Agency 1996. ISBN 87-7279-029-6 Online
- Jacobsen, Jan Krag; Husby, Ida; Skaarup, Bi; Holm, Lotte; Carlsen, Helle Brønnum; Bojesen, Rasmus Bo (1997), Maden i kulturhistorisk perspektiv
- Jacobsen, Jan Krag; Husby, Ida; Skaarup, Bi; Holm, Lotte; Carlsen, Helle Brønnum; Bojesen, Rasmus Bo (1997), Den danske madkultur, Ministry of Culture, archived from the original on May 26, 2009
- Roesdahl, Else (red.) Dagligliv i Danmarks Middelalder. Chapter: "Samfærdsel, handel og penge", 1999 ISBN 87-00-22888-5.
