= Amy Willcock =

Amy Willcock is an American-born United Kingdom-based cookery book writer, who having specialised in cooking on the AGA cooker, is popularly known as the "Queen of AGA cooking."

Born in Chicago, she moved to the UK with her young family in 1980. On discovering the AGA-cooker, she began developing recipes, and then became an AGA cookery demonstrator. Her first book "Aga Cooking" was published in October 2002 by Ebury Press.

She has since developed a dual-career, giving AGA Know How workshops around the UK, and as a cookery book author. Willcock appeared as judge on the 2010 edition of BBC One's Celebrity Masterchef.

Resident with her family on the Isle of Wight, Wilcock has two daughters, and runs the most successful Women's Institute group in the UK.

== Publications ==
- Amy Willcock (3 Oct 2002). Aga Cooking. Ebury Press. ISBN 0-09-188621-X.
- Amy Willcock (2 Oct 2003). Amy Willcock's Aga Baking. Ebury Press. ISBN 0-09-189182-5.
- Amy Willcock (2 Oct 2003). Amy Willcock's Aga Know How. Ebury Press. ISBN 0-09-189583-9.
- Amy Willcock (7 Oct 2004). Amy Willcock's Aga Seasons. Ebury Press. ISBN 0-09-189913-3.
- Amy Willcock (3 Feb 2005). Amy Willcock's B&B Know How. Ebury Press. ISBN 0-09-190075-1.
- Amy Willcock (6 Oct 2005). At Home with Amy Willcock: 150 Recipes for Every Occasion from the Queen of Aga Cookery. Ebury Press. ISBN 0-09-190389-0.
- Amy Willcock (5 Oct 2006). The Aga Bible. Ebury Press. ISBN 0-09-191072-2.
- Amy Willcock (26 July 2007). Troubleshooting Tips for Your Aga. Ebury Press. ISBN 978-0-09-192015-9.
- Amy Willcock (7 May 2009). Cooking for One: 150 Recipes to Treat Yourself. Ebury Press. ISBN 978-0-09-192671-7.
