= Petra Paredez =

Pastry chef

Petra “Petee” Paredez is a pastry chef and cookbook author. She is the co-owner, with her husband Robert, of Petee's Pie Company in New York City’s Lower East Side, and Petee's Café in Brooklyn, New York.

== Biography ==
Paredez was born into a baking family. Before she was born, her parents opened Mom’s Apple Pie Company in Leesburg, Virginia.

== Publications ==
- Pie for Everyone: Recipes and Stories from Pete’s Pie, New York’s Best Pie Shop
