= Rebekka Wolf =

German-Jewish author

Rebekka Wolf (née, Heinemann) was a German-Jewish cookbook author. In 1851, she published Kochbuch für israelitische Frauen (cookbook for Jewish women). It was continuously revised and expanded through 14 editions. The last known edition was published in Frankfurt in 1933.
