= Sarah St. John =

Sarah St. John (December 1669 – April 1755) was an English clergyman's wife who owned, and maintained over many years, a manuscript recipe book.

== Life ==
Sarah Oliver was the daughter of a Kentish gentleman, Thomas Oliver. She married. c.1698 a clergyman John St. John who was made vicar of Yeldon in Hertfordshire. He died in 1707. Sarah, now a widow with several children, moved back to her home town of Sevenoaks in Kent. Her spinster daughter Sarah, who lived with her, outlived her by a year.

== Recipe book ==
In 1705 Sarah [senior] signed the flyleaf of a large manuscript cookery and medical recipe book. She maintained this book for at least 50 years, helped in later years by her daughter. The book is very well organized, having an index to cookery recipes in the front with additions for later recipes inserted. The recipes themselves are arranged systematically in sections, with adequate space usually left for additions. Reversing the book, one comes to the medical recipes at the rear. These too are arranged in sections with full index. Overall the book is neat and tidy, without the sprawl of later additions found in some books or the clumsy insertions of recipes in small blank spaces.

Several hands have written extensively in the book. A distinctive rounded hand occurs only on pages one to twenty-nine of the food recipes in the front of the book and in all cases it is the first in the various sections where it is found. This hand begins sections on: Puddings, Soups, Brawn, Beef, Mutton, Veal, and Lamb. These are all basic foodstuffs, main courses cooked by boiling or roasting. Their preparation was primarily the job of a cook, not a gentlewoman. It is likely that Sarah was presented with the book on or soon after marriage, with this basic section already inserted. Another hand, which substantially added to the book, compiled the front index, and started adding medical recipes to the back, is most probably that of Sarah. A third hand, the most prolific in the book, added more recipes, including some dated in the 1750s - this is probably that of Sarah junior. Many recipes are attributed to donors, and some can be identified as members of the neighbouring gentry.

At a rough page count, the book has 82 pages of meat and fish recipes, sweet dishes and preserves of all sorts occupy 121 pages, wines take up 14, pickles 11, and medicines of all sorts, in both sections of the book, approximately 147 pages. The book is a good example of a household recipe book as used in a gentry household in the early eighteenth century. The way the book was used is evident: tried and trusted recipes are noted with approval, others have been tried and rejected. Additional ingredients or stages of the recipe are noted and the book was clearly used as a ‘living document’ over many decades. The medical section at the rear shows the wide scope of household medicine at this time, including medicines for the relief of serious conditions such as cancer and epilepsy.
