= Rose Reisman =

Canadian author, chef and nutritionist

Rose Reisman is a Canadian teacher, author, chef and nutritionist who promotes healthy eating and lifestyle. She is the author of more than 20 cookbooks and the health expert on local and national television and radio shows.

== Early life and education ==
Rose Reisman was born in Toronto, Ontario, Canada.

After completing her high school education, Reisman went on to York University, where she earned a Bachelor of Fine Arts in 1975. After graduating, she then earned a Bachelor of Education at the University of Toronto.

In 1985, Reisman was awarded a Master of Business Administration degree at York University.

== Career ==
In 1988, Reisman wrote her first book on the Toronto Dessert Scene. The book met with modest success, and she wrote a second book on the Manhattan Dessert Scene. After two more books and battling her own health issues, Reisman abandoned the traditional cookbook market to focus solely on healthy eating. Her first cookbook in that genre was called Rose Reisman Brings Home Light Cooking and was written in association with Canadian Breast Cancer Foundation. The next book in the series was Rose Reisman Brings Home Easy Pasta.

In 2004, Reisman founded Rose Reisman Catering, a healthy eating catering company in Canada.

Reisman wrote 20 cookbooks, including The Art of Living Well, The Complete Light Kitchen, and The Vegetarian Kitchen. She is the author of a regular column for the Toronto Star and has appeared on numerous television and radio shows to share her expertise on healthy eating and living.

She has been recognized with various awards, including the Women's Executive Network's Top 100 Most Powerful Women in Canada Award in 2010 and the YWCA's Women of Distinction Award. Since 2013, she is a host of the show Food Bites on CityNews 660.

Reisman also supports several charitable organizations, including the Heart and Stroke Foundation, the Canadian Cancer Society and the Children's Wish Foundation.

== Personal life ==
Rose Reisman is married and has four children.

== Books ==
- Manhattan's Dessert Scene: New York City's Top Dessert Spots Reveal Their Secret Recipes, 1989 ISBN 0-9693365-1-9
- Rose Reisman Brings Home Pasta Dishes: Healthful Pasta Recipes from Top Restaurants Made Easy, 1991 ISBN 978-0836221060
- Rose Reisman Brings Home Spa Desserts: Low-Calorie Recipes from Top Resorts Made Easy, 1991 ISBN 978-0836221053
- Rose Reisman Brings Home Light Cooking, 1995 ISBN 978-1896503004
- Rose Reisman's Enlightened Home Cooking, 1996 ISBN 978-1896503127
- Break The Weight Loss Barrier Paperback, 1996 ISBN 0-13-574153-X
- Rose Reisman Light Vegetarian Cooking Paperback, 1998 ISBN 978-1896503660
- Divine Indulgences: Rose Reismans Sensational Light Desserts, 2001 ISBN 978-0143016120
- Rose Reisman Bring Home Light Pasta Paperback, 2002 ISBN 1896503020
- The Art of Living Well: 6 Ways to Achieve Total Harmony in Your Life, 2002 ISBN 0-670-04347-8
- Complete Idiot Guide Light Desserts Paperback, 2002 ISBN 0-02-864446-8
- Weekday Wonders: Healthy Light Meals for Every Day: A Cookbook, 2004 ISBN 0-14-301615-6
- Balance of Living Well: 6 Ways To Achieve Total Harmony In Your Life, 2006 ISBN 0-14-305152-0
- Rose Reisman's Family Favorites: Healthy Meals for Those Who Matter Most Paperback, 2011ISBN 000724763X
- The Complete Light Kitchen, 2011 ISBN 1-55285-871-5
- Secrets for Permanent Weight Loss: With 150 Delicious and Healthy Recipes for Success, 2011 ISBN 1-55285-719-0
- Rose Reisman's Choose It and Lose It: The Road Map to Healthier Eating at Your Favourite Restaurants, 2012 ISBN 1770500995
- The Best of Rose Reisman: 20 Years of Healthy Recipes, 2013 ISBN 1770501991
- Rose Reisman's Rush Hour Meals: Recipes for the Entire Family, 2016 ISBN 177050303X
- Be Blissed Cannabis Cookbook with Rose Reisman - Easy Cannabis Infused Recipes for Home, 2020 ISBN 1525581783
- Rose Reisman's Meal Revolution: Recipes Inspired by Canada's New Food Guide, 2020 ISBN 1525566628
