= Candice Hutchings =

Canadian YouTube personality, vegan chef, comedian, and author

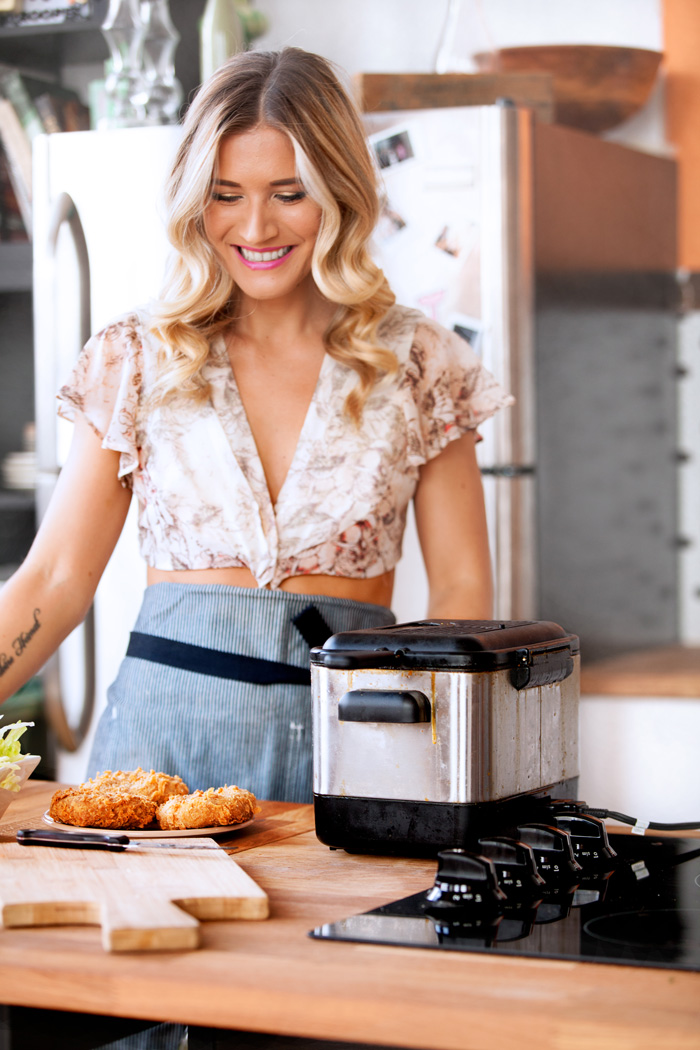
- Candice Hutchings cooking "vegan fried chicken" (Seitan)
- Born: May 16, 1988 (age 38); Lahr, Baden-Württemberg, Germany
- Other name: The Edgy Veg
- Occupations: YouTuber; actress; author; chef; comedian; vegan activist

YouTube information
- Channel: Edgy Veg
- Genres: Vegan cooking; comedy; vegan lifestyle
- Subscribers: 520,000
- Views: 41.4 million
- Last updated: 4 August 2026
- Website: theedgyveg.com

Candice Hutchings (born May 16, 1988) is a Canadian YouTube personality, vegan chef, comedian, and author. She runs a YouTube cookery-related channel The Edgy Veg. Since beginning her channel in October 2012, her videos have received over 31 million views (December 2022), and her channel has accumulated over 457 thousand subscribers. As of March 2017, she was one of the most popular vegan chefs on YouTube.

== Career ==
In December 2009, Hutchings created a blog site called "The Edgy Veggie" where she posted raw and vegan recipes. In 2013 she renamed it to "The Edgy Veg", to, as she puts it "not be so cutesie". Also in 2013, she was working with the company, Belmonte Raw, as an administrative supervisor. As of March 2017, her website received over 200,000 pageviews per month, is regularly referenced by media, and other vegan chefs.

In October 2012, Hutchings started a YouTube channel under the pseudonym "The Edgy Veg", where she posts videos of her vegan recipes. One of her focuses is to create vegan versions of classic comfort foods. Popular recipes featured on her channel include vegan versions of hamburgers and chicken wings. In October 2015, she quit her job in advertising to work on the channel full-time. As of March 2017, the channel has received over 9.8 million views, and over 200,000 subscribers.

Hutchings has appeared on CTV Television Network's The Social, SiriusXM's "What She Said!" and was a featured creator as part of the launch of Canada's first YouTube Space. She was also a featured creator at the 2016 Buffer Festival where she screened her video "Fantastic Vegans and Where to Find Them". She has worked as a mentor to other, newer YouTubers in Toronto.

In 2017, Hutchings made her debut as a published author, releasing her first cookbook titled The Edgy Veg, Carnivore Approved Recipes. She toured throughout North America. As of 2016, she has been a contributing chef/author for Chloe Coscarelli's byCHLOE vegan restaurant chain based in New York City.

== Books ==
- The Edgy Veg: 138 Carnivore-Approved Vegan Recipes, ISBN 0778805816

== Awards ==
| Year | Award Show | Category | Result | Ref. |
|---|---|---|---|---|
| 2018 | 9th Annual TASTE AWARDS | Best Home Chef in a Series | Won | |
| 2017 | Taste Canada Awards | Best Health and Special Diet Blog | Nominated | |
| 2016 | Taste Awards | Best Instructional Web Series | Nominated | |
| 2016 | Now Magazine Readers Choice Awards | Best Blogger | Nominated | |
| 2016 | Toronto Veg Awards | Favourite Local Pro-Veg YouTube Channel | Nominated | |
| 2013 | Best Health Mag | Best Health Blog Awards | Won (Runner Up) | |

== See also ==
- List of YouTube personalities
