= Kim McCosker =

Australian author

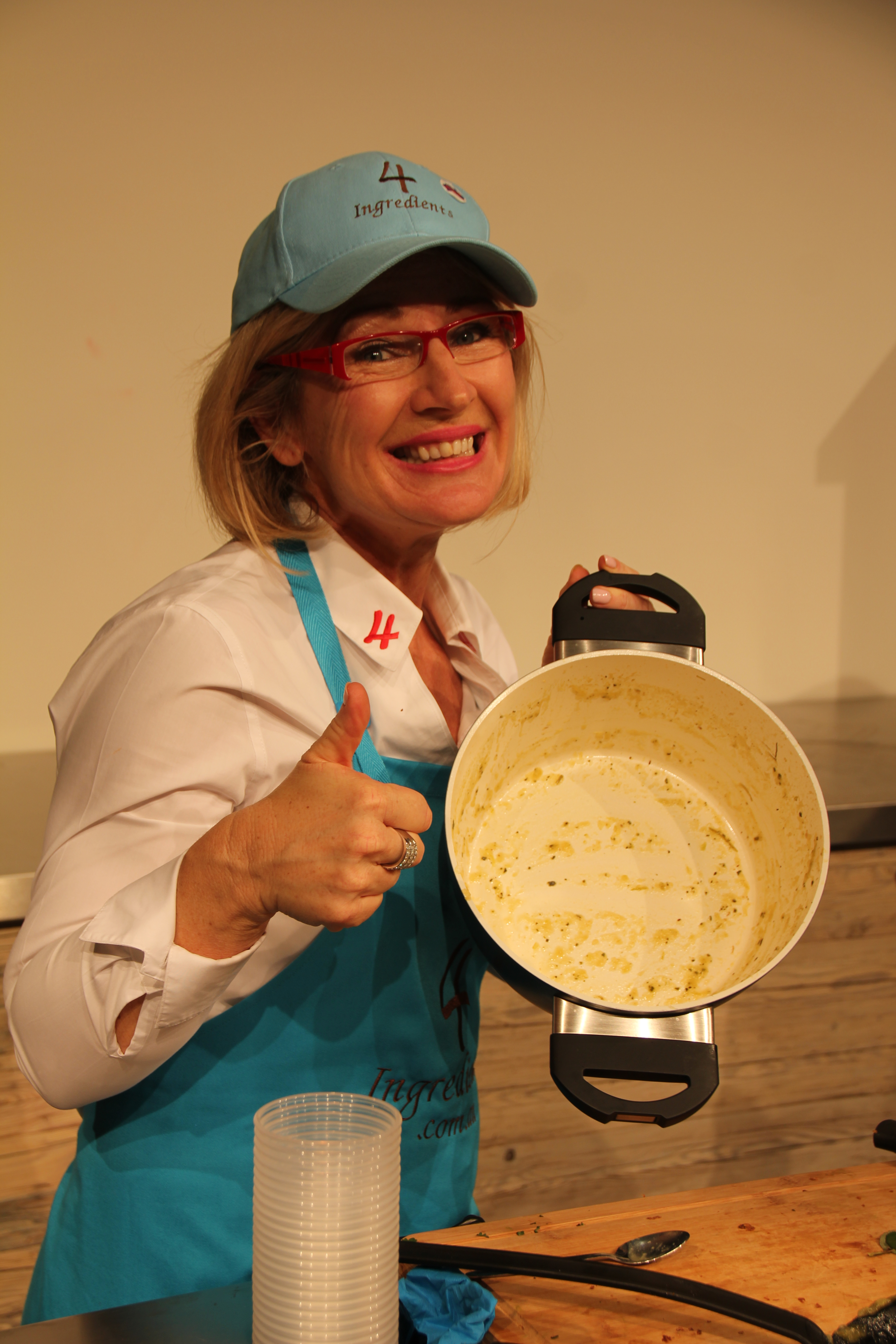

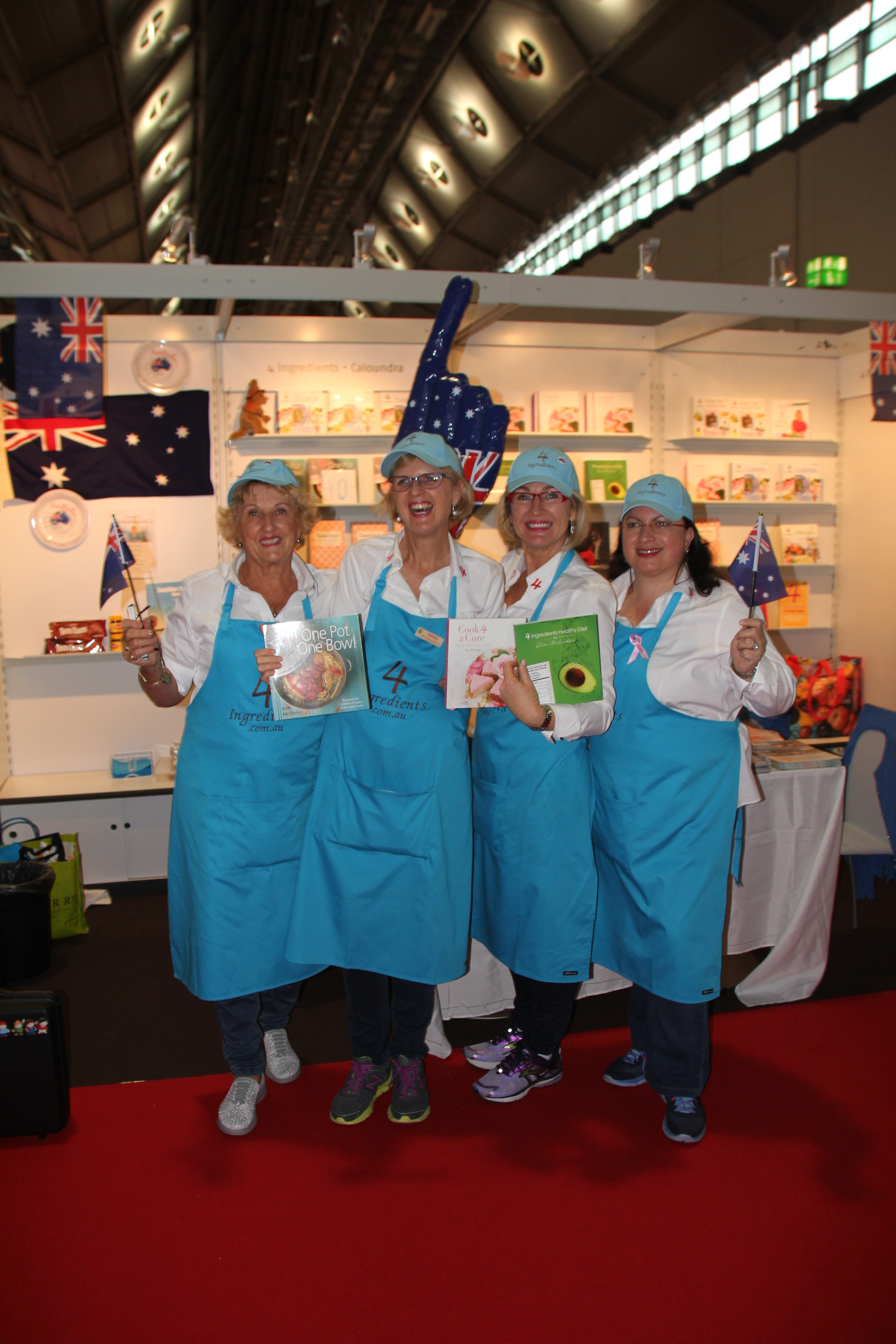

Kim McCosker is an Australian author, responsible for the popular 4 Ingredients series of cookbooks.

== 4 Ingredients ==
Kim McCosker has been called "cooking's J. K. Rowling." After being turned down by every major publisher in Australia, she self-published her first cookbook, 4 Ingredients, which went on to become the best selling self-published book in Australian history, selling 400,000 copies in 2007 alone and placing second in overall sales only to Rowling's Harry Potter and the Deathly Hallows released the same year.

4 Ingredients has gone on to reach a total sales mark of over 3 million copies. The initial 4 Ingredients book has spawned 37 cookbooks.

The collective sales across all titles now exceeds 9 million copies. The brand extended to a cookware range, 4 Ingredients iPhone app and a social media reach, with an active daily presence on Facebook, Instagram, Pinterest and its own website.

The popularity of the 4 Ingredients series has also led to a 4 Ingredients television series, hosted by McCosker and broadcast in 24 countries including Australia, Africa, the UK, and New Zealand.

== Other publications ==
- 4 Ingredients
- 4 Ingredients 2
- 4 Ingredients Gluten Free
- 4 Ingredients Fast, Fresh & Healthy (co-authored by Deepak Chopra)
- 4 Ingredients Kids (black & white)
- BABY BOWL
- 4 Ingredients Christmas
- 4 Ingredients KiDS (illustrated)
- 4 Ingredients Herb it Up (written for Gourmet Garden)
- 4 Ingredients One Pot One Bowl
- 4 Ingredients Chocolates, Cakes & Cute Things
- 4 Ingredients Menu Planning
- ThermoStruck
- 4 Ingredients YIAH
- 4PLAY
- 4 Ingredients Gluten Free Lactose Free (endorsed by Coeliac Australia)
- 4 Ingredients Diabetes (endorsed by Diabetes Australia - Victoria)
- 4 Ingredients Allergies (endorsed by Allergies & Anaphylaxis NZ)
- 4 Ingredients Cook 4 A Cure (written to raise funds for the NBCF)
- 4 Ingredients Celebrations
- 4 Ingredients The Easiest One Pot Cookbook Ever!
- The Easiest Slow Cooker Book Ever!
- 4 Ingredients Healthy Diet
- PET COOKBOOK
- 4 Ingredients KETO
- 4 Ingredients Veggie & Vegan
- The Easiest Pie Maker Book Ever!
- The Easiest Air Fryer Book Ever!
- 4 Ingredients MORE Diabetes (due out April 2021)

== Personal ==
McCosker lives Sunshine Coast, Queensland with husband Glen Turnbull and their three children.
