= Clotilde Dusoulier =

French food writer (born 1979)

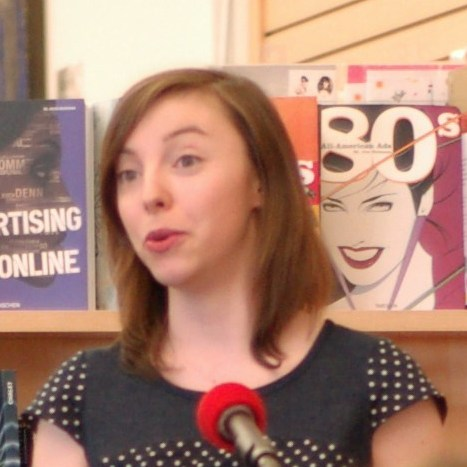
Clotilde Dusoulier in Berkeley, California on a 2007 book tour for her book Chocolate and Zucchini: Daily Adventures in a Parisian Kitchen

Clotilde Dusoulier (born 1979) is a French food writer from Paris. She runs a popular food blog called Chocolate & Zucchini and has published several books related to French food.

Clotilde writes in English and in French, and her books have been published in the U.S., the UK, France, and Taiwan.

== Life and career ==
Clotilde Dusoulier was born and raised in Paris. She studied software engineering at the Dauphine Paris IX university. She later went on to work as a software engineer in California and in Paris. She created her blog Chocolate & Zucchini in September 2003 as a creative outlet. Chocolate & Zucchini was part of the first generation of food blogs, and she was the first French person to ever write a food blog. When she signed a book deal with Broadway Books in 2005, she quit her IT job and became a full-time food writer.

In her books and on her blog, Clotilde Dusoulier shares her passion for all things food-related: recipe ideas and cooking inspiration, musings on ingredients, cookbook acquisitions, cooking tools, and restaurant experiences. Over the years, Clotilde Dusoulier has gradually focused more and more on sustainable food, based on ingredients produced or procured in a way that is not harmful to our planet. Besides running her blog, she now writes food and travel articles for magazines in English and in French, writes and edits cookbooks, and works as a recipe developer, public speaker, and food trend consultant. She writes mainly in English, but most of her material is also published in French. She presents food and a food-related lifestyle in a friendly, approachable way. According to The New York Times, Clotilde is "the Parisian friend we all wished we had."

The bulk of Clotilde Dusoulier's cooking education comes from observing her mother and teaching herself. She also took a one-year class in traditional French cooking and has worked a few stints in professional kitchens. Clotilde lives in Paris with her partner Maxence Bernard and their son Milan.

== Bibliography ==
As an author she has written such books as:

- Chocolate & Zucchini: Daily Adventures in a Parisian Kitchen (Broadway Books, 2007)
- Chocolat & Zucchini (Marabout, 2007)
- Clotilde's Edible Adventures in Paris (Broadway Books, 2008)
- The French Market Cookbook (Clarkson Potter, 2013)
- Tasting Paris (Random House USA Inc, 2018)

She has also been a consulting editor to such books as:

- I Know How To Cook (Ginette Mathiot, Phaidon, 2010)
- The Art of French Baking (Ginette Mathiot, Phaidon, 2011)

== Awards ==
- 2009 Foodbuzz Food Blog Award: Best Writing Voice
- 2009 Gourmand World Cookbook Awards: Best Culinary Travel Guide
- 2008 Weblog Awards: Best European Blog
- 2007 Gourmand World Cookbook Awards: Best French Cuisine Book
- 2005 Food Blog Awards: Best Writing and Best Recipes
- 2004 Food Blog Awards: Best Writing, Best Recipes, Best Site Design and Best Overall Food Blog
