= Maren Elisabeth Bang =

Norwegian author of cookbooks and housekeeping guides (1797–1884)

Maren Elisabeth Bang (1797–1884) was a Norwegian cookbook writer who wrote the first printed Norwegian cookbook Huusholdnings-Bog, indrettet efter den almindelige Brug i norske Huusholdninger in 1831. Her early publications were anonymous but after 1842 she published in her own name. She was the most productive 19th-century Norwegian author of cookbooks and housekeeping guides.

== Biography ==
The daughter of Hans Arnt Poulsen (1768–1809) and Sara Elisabeth Bergström (1770–1845), she was brought up at Skansgården near Kongsvinger in south-eastern Norway. In 1817, she married Lieutenant Lauritz Christian Steen Bang who from 1829 to 1839 was imprisoned for embezzlement while working at Norges Bank in Christiania (now Oslo). While he was in prison, Maren Bang earned a living by selling meals, which she either delivered herself or sold from home. She recorded her recipes, first publishing Huusholdnings-Bog, indrettet efter den almindelige Brug i norske Huusholdninger (Housekeeping Book, Prepared in Accordance with Normal Practice in Norwegian Households) in 1831, with new editions in 1834 and 1838. A selection of her recipes was published separately as Den Norske Kokkepige (The Norwegian Cooking Girl) in 1835.

Later publications included Huusholdningsbog for Almuen Housekeeping for General Use), Slagtebog (Charcuterie), Almindelig Syltebog (Preservation and Pickling), Nyttige Huusraad (Useful Housekeeping Tips), Bagebog (Baking Book) and Praktisk Farve-Bog for Almuen (Practical Methods of Dyeing).

In 1849, the couple moved to Kristiansand where Lieutenant Bang ran a restaurant until his death in 1862. Thereafter, Maren Bang returned to her writing, undertaking major revisions of her earlier works while publishing Vinbog (Wine Book) and Raad og Veiledning for Landmanden (Advice and Guidance for Countrymen).

Bang spent her later years in Kristiania where she died of gastroenteritis on 3 July 1884.
