= Marthe Miral =

Fictional author of Canadian hospitality guides

Marthe Miral was a fictional Francophone author or "house name" created by the Maple Leaf Milling Company Limited to market cookbooks to a French-speaking Canadian audience during the Great Depression. "Anna Lee Scott" was the Anglophone version of the author created by the flour company to market cookbooks, "home study" courses, hospitality and etiquette manuals to Canadian women in print and through newspaper and radio advertising. According to Elizabeth Driver, the following individuals published under the Anna Lee Scott/Marthe Miral pseudonyms: Katherine Caldwell Bayley, Grace Barbara Gray, Ethel Whitham, Mary Adams, Helen Gagen, and Sally Henry.

Katherine Caldwell Bayley was a home economist who also published under the persona Ann Adam for The Globe & Mail and the Winnipeg Free Press in the 1930s as well as Anna Lee Scott for the Maple Leaf Milling Company. Grace Barbara Gray (1908-1977) was a graduate of the MacDonald Institute in Guelph. She served as a dietician in the Canadian Navy at Halifax during the Second World War before joining Maple Leaf Milling and publishing under the persona from 1945 to 1951. Ethel Whitham took on the persona from 1951 to 1957, followed by Mary Adams from 1957 to 1963. Helen Gagen (1908-1998) was a home economist, who graduated from the University of Toronto. She and Sally Henry were the final two women to publish under the Anna Lee Scott name.

== Publications ==
- Scott, Anna Lee. Maple Leaf Cooking School.: A Complete Home Study Course for Beginners and Others in Twelve Easy Lessons.
- Scott, Anna Lee. Christmas Recipes. Toronto: Maple Leaf Milling Company, 1930.
- Miral, Marthe. L'Art de recevoir. Montreal: La Presse, 1934.
- Miral, Marthe. L'art d'acheter les aliments et de composer des menus hygiéniques : l'idéal, pour votre temps et pour votre argent. Montreal: La Presse, 1934.
- Scott, Anna Lee. Planning the Party. Montreal: Montreal Daily Star, 193-?].
- Miral, Marthe. 51 Façons d'atteindre Le Coeur d'un Homme. Toronto: Maple Leaf Milling Company, 1939.
- Scott, Anna Lee. 51 Ways to a Man's Heart. Toronto: Maple Leaf Milling Company, 1939.
