= Susanna Eger =

German cookbook writer

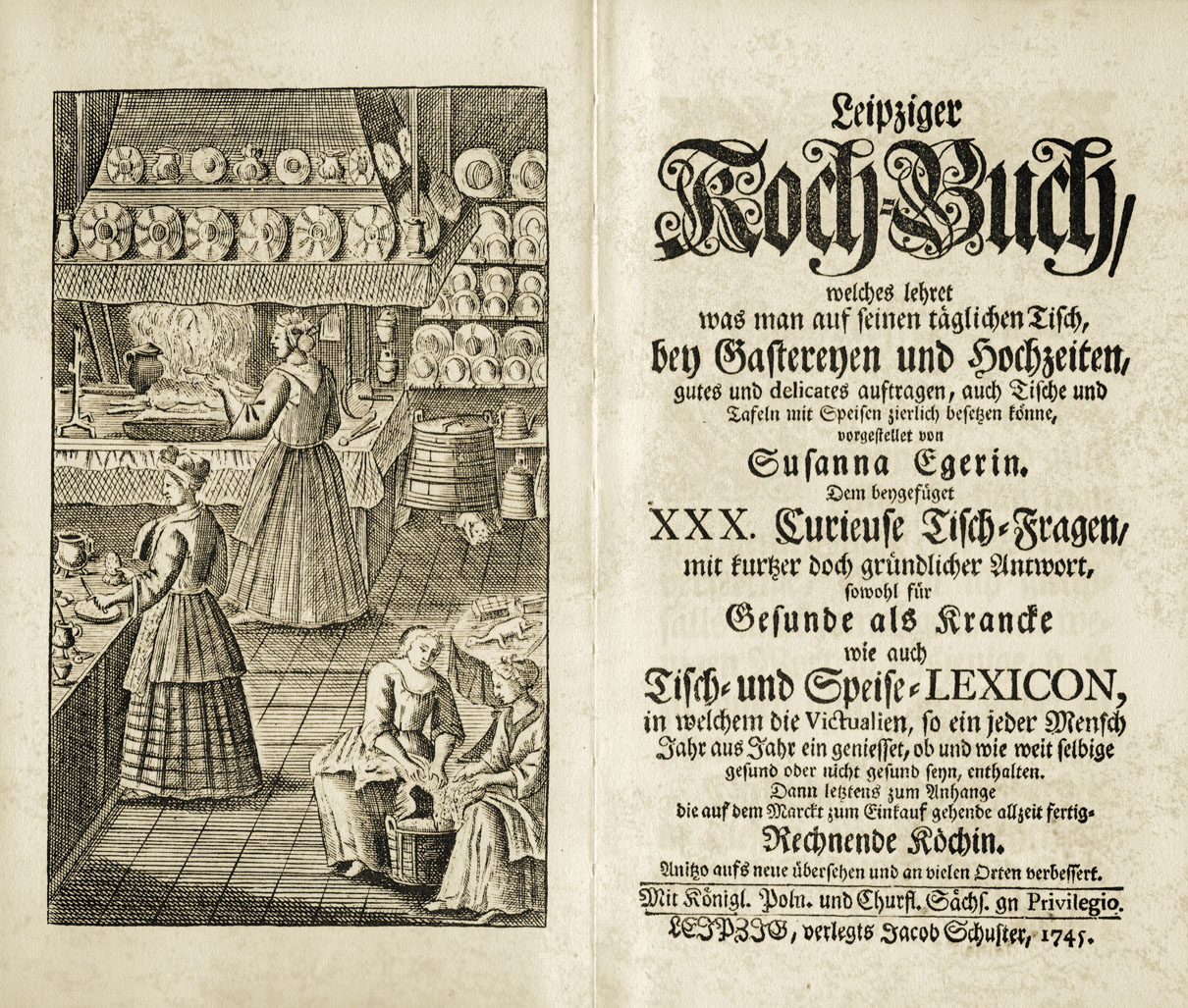
Leipziger Kochbuch, 1745 edition

Susanna Eger, also Egerin, née Born (1640–1713) was a German cook and cookbook writer. She is remembered for her pioneering Leipziger Kochbuch (Leipzig Cookbook), first published in 1706. It was later translated into Swedish as En nödig och nyttig hushålds och kokbok (1733), becoming one of Sweden's earliest cookbooks.

== Biography ==
Born in Leipzig in 1640, Eger was the daughter of Carl Günther Born, a chandler. In 1657, she married the merchant Johann Jacob Eger from Lindau with whom she had four children. Following the early death of her husband, she began to earn her livelihood by becoming a cook for Leipzig's affluent burgers.

As a result of carefully noting some 900 recipes, in 1706 she was able to publish her Leipziger Kochbuch. The first edition was published under her initials "S. E.", but later editions gave her full name as Susanna Egerin. Early editions gave the full title as "Leipziger Koch-Buch, worinnen zu sehen, was man so wohl auf seinen Täglichen Tisch, als auch bey Gastereyen und Hochzeiten, gutes und delicates auftragen, auch Tische und Tafeln mit Spiesen zierlich besetzen kan." (roughly: Leipzig cookbook containing both fine and delicate dishes for everyday use and for presenting on the tables of receptions and weddings). The cookbook is one of the earliest containing precise details of quantities, weights and measures.

Five editions of the Leipziger Kochbuch were published between 1706 and 1745. It was reprinted in 1984 with a new edition in 2005. Susanna Eger died in Leipzig in 1713.
