= Smoking ban =

Law prohibiting tobacco smoking in a given space

An internationally recognizable "no smoking" sign

Smoking bans, or smoke-free laws, are public policies, including criminal laws and occupational safety and health regulations, that prohibit tobacco smoking in certain spaces. The spaces most commonly affected by smoking bans are indoor workplaces and buildings open to the public such as restaurants, bars, office buildings, schools, retail stores, hospitals, libraries, transport facilities, and government buildings, in addition to public transport vehicles such as aircraft, buses, watercraft, and trains. However, laws may also prohibit smoking in outdoor areas such as parks, beaches, pedestrian plazas, college and hospital campuses, and within a certain distance from the entrance to a building, and in some cases, private vehicles and multi-unit residences.

The most common rationale cited for restrictions on smoking is the negative health effects associated with secondhand smoke (SHS), or the inhalation of tobacco smoke by persons who are not smoking. These include diseases such as heart disease, cancer, and chronic obstructive pulmonary disease. The number of smoking bans around the world increased substantially in the late 20th century and early 21st century due to increased knowledge about these health risks. Many early smoking restrictions merely required the designation of non-smoking areas in buildings, but policies of this type became less common following evidence that they did not eliminate the health concerns associated with SHS.

Opinions on smoking bans vary. Many individuals and organizations such as the World Health Organization (WHO) support smoking bans on the basis that they improve health outcomes by reducing exposure to SHS and possibly decreasing the number of people who smoke, while others oppose smoking bans and assert that they violate individual and property rights and cause economic hardship, among other issues.

== Rationale ==
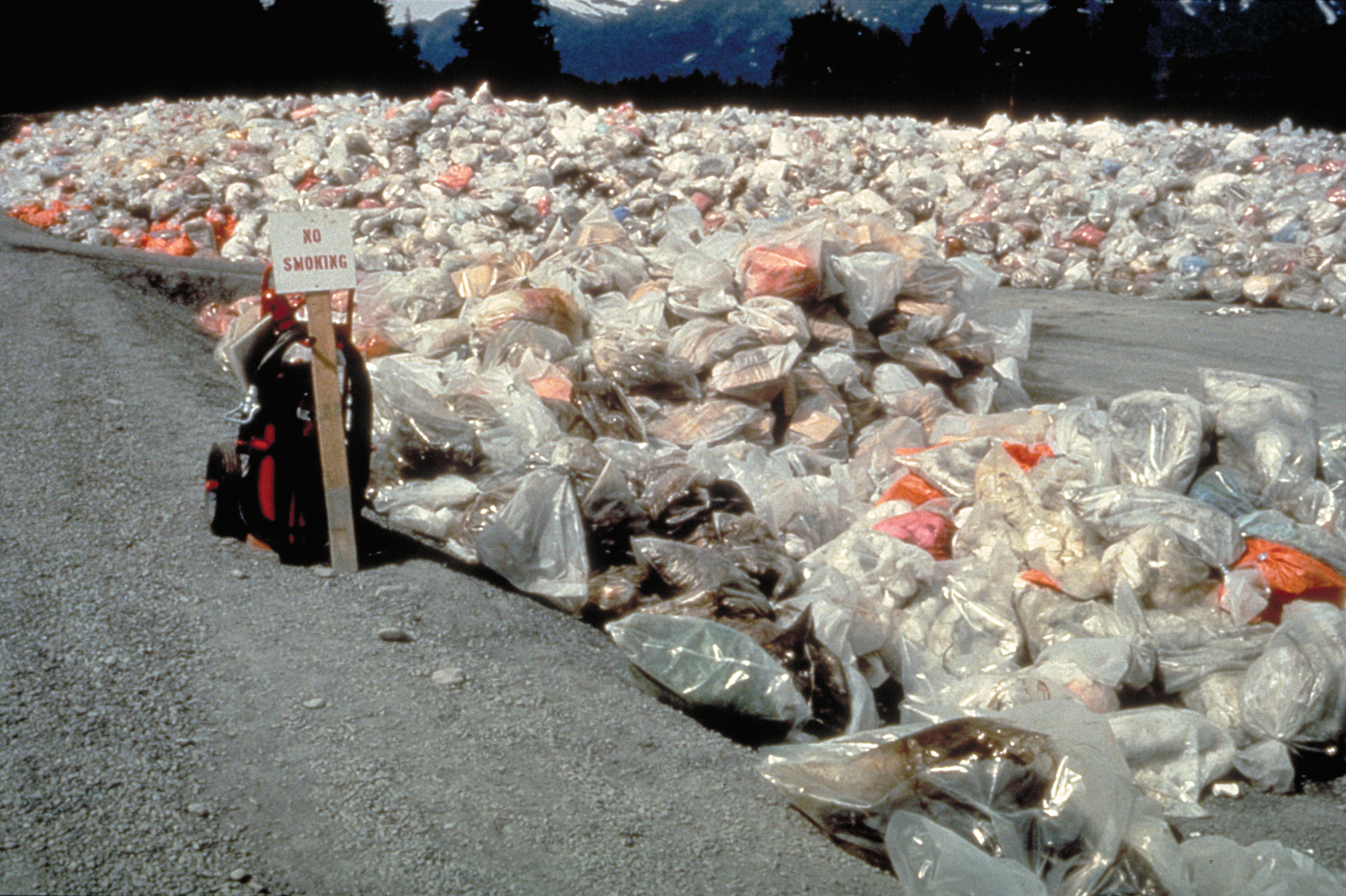
Sometimes smoking is prohibited for safety reasons related to the burning embers produced. Oily waste is piled up after the Exxon Valdez oil spill next to a small No Smoking sign.

Smoking bans are usually enacted in an attempt to protect non-smokers from the effects of secondhand smoke, which include an increased risk of heart disease, cancer, chronic obstructive pulmonary disease, and other diseases. Laws implementing bans on indoor smoking have been introduced by many countries and other jurisdictions as public knowledge about these health risks increased.

Additional rationales for smoking restrictions include reduced risk of fire in areas with explosive hazards; cleanliness in places where food, pharmaceuticals, semiconductors, or precision instruments and machinery are produced; decreased legal liability; potentially reduced energy use via decreased ventilation needs; reduced quantities of litter; healthier environments; and giving smokers incentive to quit.

== Evidence basis ==
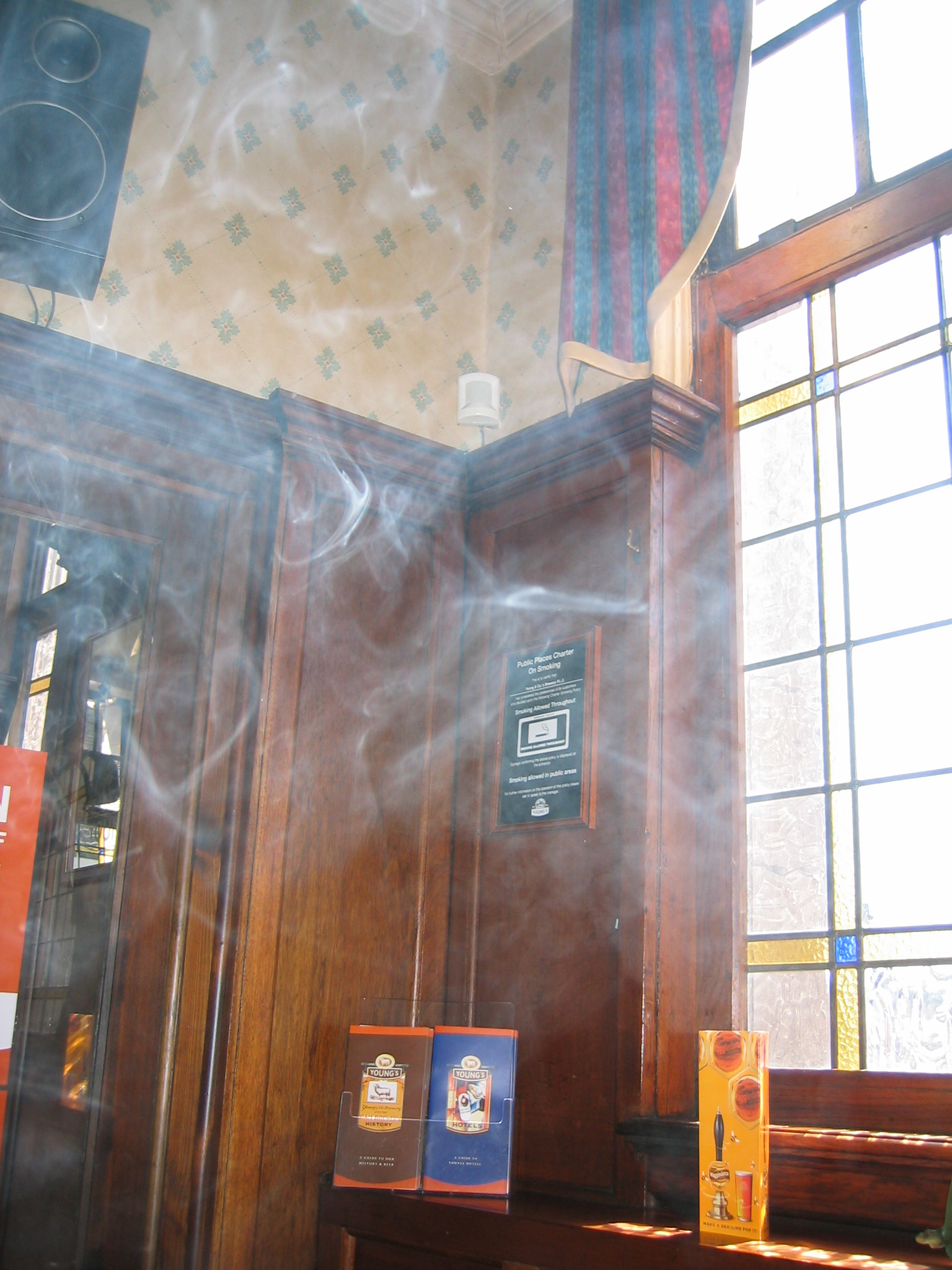
Tobacco smoke in an Irish pub before a smoking ban came into effect on March 29, 2004

Research has generated evidence that secondhand smoke causes the same problems as direct smoking, including lung cancer, cardiovascular disease, and lung ailments such as emphysema, bronchitis, and asthma. Specifically, meta-analyses show that lifelong non-smokers with partners who smoke in the home have a 20–30% greater risk of lung cancer than non-smokers who live with non-smokers. Non-smokers exposed to cigarette smoke in the workplace have an increased lung cancer risk of 16–19%. An epidemiology report by the Institute of Medicine (IOM), convened by the United States Centers for Disease Control and Prevention (CDC), says that the risk of coronary heart disease is increased by around 25–30% when one is exposed to secondhand smoke. The data shows that even at low levels of exposure, there is a risk, and the risk increases with more exposure.

A study issued in 2002 by the International Agency for Research on Cancer of the World Health Organization concluded that non-smokers are exposed to the same carcinogens on account of tobacco smoke as active smokers. Sidestream smoke emitted from the burning ends of tobacco products contains 69 known carcinogens, particularly benzopyrene and other polynuclear aromatic hydrocarbons, and radioactive decay products, such as polonium-210. Several well-established carcinogens have been shown by the tobacco companies' own research to be present at higher concentrations in secondhand smoke than in mainstream smoke.

Scientific organisations confirming the effects of secondhand smoke include the U.S. National Cancer Institute, the U.S. Centers for Disease Control and Prevention, the U.S. National Institutes of Health, the Surgeon General of the United States, and the World Health Organization.

=== Air quality in bars and restaurants ===
Restrictions on smoking in bars and restaurants can substantially improve the air quality in such establishments. For example, one study listed on the website of the CDC states that New York's statewide law to eliminate smoking in enclosed workplaces and public places substantially reduced RSP (respirable suspended particles) levels in western New York hospitality venues. RSP levels were reduced in every venue that permitted smoking before the law was implemented, including venues in which only smoke from an adjacent room was observed at baseline. The CDC concluded that their results were similar to other studies, which also showed substantially improved indoor air quality after smoking bans were instituted.

A 2004 study showed New Jersey bars and restaurants had more than nine times the levels of indoor air pollution of neighbouring New York City, which had already enacted its smoking ban.

Research has also shown that improved air quality translates to decreased toxin exposure among employees. For example, among employees of the Norwegian establishments that enacted smoking restrictions, tests showed decreased levels of nicotine in the urine of both smoking and non-smoking workers (as compared with measurements before going smoke-free).

A 2024 systematic review revealed that air quality in partially enclosed outdoor hospitality venues where smoking is permitted as well as inside the adjacent outdoor and indoor non-smoking areas often exceeded the World Health Organization PM_{2.5} guidelines, supporting the extension of smoke-free policies to outdoor hospitality settings.

=== Public Health Law Research ===
In 2009, the Public Health Law Research Program, a national program office of the US-based Robert Wood Johnson Foundation, published an evidence brief summarising the research assessing the effect of a specific law or policy on public health. They stated that "There is strong evidence supporting smoking bans and restrictions as effective public health interventions aimed at decreasing exposure to secondhand smoke."

== History ==
1973 and 2007 ABC news reports on the initial, and then the complete, indoor smoking bans in Victoria, Australia.

One of the world's earliest smoking bans was a 1575 Roman Catholic Church regulation which forbade the use of tobacco in any church in Mexico. In 1590, Pope Urban VII moved against smoking in all church-owned buildings. He threatened to excommunicate anyone who "took tobacco in the porchway of or inside a church, whether it be by chewing it, smoking it with a pipe or sniffing it in powdered form through the nose". Pope Urban VIII imposed similar restrictions in 1624. In 1604 King James VI and I published an anti-smoking treatise, A Counterblaste to Tobacco, that had the effect of raising taxes on tobacco. Russia banned tobacco for 70 years from 1627. The Ottoman Sultan Murad IV prohibited smoking in his empire in 1633 and had smokers executed. The earliest citywide European smoking bans were enacted shortly thereafter. Such bans were enacted in Bavaria, Kursachsen, and certain parts of Austria in the late 17th century. Smoking was banned in Berlin in 1723, in Königsberg in 1742, and in Stettin in 1744. These bans were repealed in the revolutions of 1848. Before 1865, Russia had a ban on smoking in the streets.

The first building in the world to ban smoking was the Old Government Building in Wellington, New Zealand, in 1876. The ban related to concerns about the threat of fire, as it is the second largest wooden building in the world.

The first modern attempt at restricting smoking saw Nazi Germany banning smoking in every university, post office, military hospital, and Nazi Party office, under the auspices of Karl Astel's Institute for Tobacco Hazards Research, established in 1941 under orders from Adolf Hitler. The Nazis conducted major anti-tobacco campaigns until the demise of their regime in 1945.

In the latter part of the 20th century, as research on the risks of secondhand tobacco smoke became public, the tobacco industry launched "courtesy awareness" campaigns. Fearing reduced sales, the industry began a media and legislative programme that focused on "accommodation". Tolerance and courtesy were encouraged as a way to ease heightened tensions between smokers and those around them, while avoiding smoking bans. In the US, states were encouraged to pass laws providing separate smoking sections.

In 1975, the U.S. state of Minnesota enacted the Minnesota Clean Indoor Air Act, making it the first state to restrict smoking in most public spaces. At first restaurants were required to have "No Smoking" sections, and bars were exempt from the Act. On 1 October 2007, Minnesota enacted a ban on smoking in all restaurants and bars via the Freedom to Breathe Act.

The resort town of Aspen, Colorado, became the first city in the US to restrict smoking in restaurants in 1985, though it allowed smoking in areas that were separately ventilated.

On 3 April 1987, the city of Beverly Hills, California, initiated an ordinance to restrict smoking in most restaurants, in retail stores, and at public meetings. It exempted restaurants in hotels – City Council members reasoned that hotel restaurants catered to large numbers of visitors from abroad, where smoking is more acceptable than in the United States.

In 1990, the city of San Luis Obispo, California, became the first city in the world to restrict indoor smoking in bars as well as in restaurants. The ban did not include workplaces, but covered all other indoor public spaces and its enforcement was somewhat limited.

In the United States, California's 1998 smoking ban encouraged other states such as New York to implement similar regulations. California's ban included a controversial restriction on smoking in bars, extending the statewide ban enacted in 1994. As of April 2009, there were 37 states with some form of smoking ban. Some areas in California began banning smoking across whole cities, including every place except residential homes. In May 2011, New York City expanded its previously implemented smoking ban by banning smoking in parks, beaches and boardwalks, public golf courses and other areas controlled by the New York City Parks Department. In recent years New York City has passed administrative codes forcing landlords of privately owned buildings, cooperatives, and condominia to adopt a smoking policy into all leases. These codes oblige landlords to enact provisions telling tenants the exact locations where they can or can not smoke. In January 2010, the mayor of Boston, Massachusetts, Thomas Menino, proposed a restriction upon smoking inside public housing apartments under the jurisdiction of the Boston Housing Authority.

On 11 November 1975, Italy banned smoking on public transit vehicles (except for smokers' rail carriages) and in some public buildings (hospitals, cinemas, theatres, museums, universities, and libraries). After an unsuccessful attempt in 1986, on 16 January 2003 the Italian parliament passed the Legge Sirchia, which would ban smoking in all indoor public places, including bars, restaurants, discotheques and offices from 10 January 2005 onward.

Smoking bans in public places

On 3 December 2003, New Zealand passed legislation to progressively implement a smoking ban in schools, school grounds, and workplaces by December 2004.

On 29 March 2004, the Republic of Ireland implemented a nationwide ban on smoking in all workplaces. In Norway, similar legislation came into force on 1 June the same year.

In Scotland, Andy Kerr, the Minister for Health and Community Care, introduced a ban on smoking in public areas on 26 March 2006. Smoking was banned in all public places in the whole of the United Kingdom in 2007, when England became the final region to have the legislation come into effect.

In 2003, India introduced a law that banned smoking in public places like restaurants, public transport, or schools. The same law also made it illegal to advertise cigarettes or other tobacco products.

In 2010 Nepal planned to enact a new anti-smoking bill that would ban smoking in public places and outlaw all tobacco advertising to prevent young people from smoking.

On 31 May 2011 Venezuela introduced a ban on smoking in all enclosed public and commercial spaces, including malls, restaurants, bars, discos, workplaces, etc.

Smoking was first restricted in schools, hospitals, trains, buses, and train stations in Turkey in 1996. In 2008, a more comprehensive smoking ban was implemented, covering all public indoor venues.

The Plage Lumière beach in La Ciotat, France, became the first beach in Europe to restrict smoking from August 2011, to encourage more tourists to visit the beach. Effective as of 1 July 2025, the prohibition of smoking in France was expanded nationwide to include beaches, in parks and public gardens, at bus shelters, in sports venues and near schools. Violators are punishable to a €135 fine.

In 2012, smoking in Costa Rica became subject to some of the most restrictive regulations in the world, with the practice being banned from many outdoor recreational and educational areas as well as in public buildings and vehicles.

== Public support ==
A 2017 YouGov survey indicated growing support for the United Kingdom's smoking ban, up to 83% from the 2007 figure of 78%. The ban was proving more popular among smokers where support had risen from 52% in 2009 to 64% in 2017.

According to a 2018 Gallup poll, 59% of U.S. adults support a ban on smoking in public places; this percentage has remained fairly consistent since 2011. The same poll showed that 25% of U.S. adults believe that smoking should be completely banned in the country, marking the highest level of support recorded by Gallup so far. Previously, the percentage of adults supporting this measure had fluctuated between 11% and 24% over nearly thirty years of Gallup's tracking.

== Effects ==
=== Effects upon health ===
Several studies have documented health and economic benefits related to smoking bans. A 2009 report by the Institute of Medicine concluded that smoking bans reduced the risk of coronary heart disease and heart attacks, but the report's authors were unable to identify the magnitude of this reduction. Also in 2009, a systematic review and meta-analysis found that bans on smoking in public places were associated with a significant reduction of incidence of heart attacks. The lead author of this meta-analysis, David Meyers, said that this review suggested that a nationwide ban on smoking in public places could prevent between 100,000 and 225,000 heart attacks in the United States each year.

A 2012 meta-analysis found that smoke-free legislation was associated with a lower rate of hospitalizations for cardiac, cerebrovascular, and respiratory diseases, and that "More comprehensive laws were associated with larger changes in risk." The senior author of this meta-analysis, Stanton Glantz, told USA Today that, concerning exemptions for certain facilities from smoking bans, "The politicians who put those exemptions in are condemning people to be put into the emergency room." A 2013 review found that smoking bans were associated with "significant reduction in acute MI [myocardial infarction] risk", but noted that "studies with smaller population in the United States usually reported larger reductions, while larger studies reported relatively modest reductions".

A 2014 systematic review and meta-analysis found that smoke-free legislation was associated with approximately 10% reductions in preterm births and hospital attendance for asthma, but not with a decrease in low birth weight. A 2016 Cochrane review found that since the previous version of that review was published in 2010, the evidence that smoking bans improved health outcomes had become more robust, especially with respect to acute coronary syndrome admissions. A 2024 systematic review and meta-analysis reported significant reductions in stroke-related hospital admissions following smoke-free legislation; for example, Florida's 2003 statewide law was associated with an 18.1% decrease in stroke hospitalizations over the course of more than three years.

However, other studies came to the conclusion that smoking bans have little or no short-term effect on myocardial infarction rates and other diseases. A 2010 study from the US used huge nationally representative databases to compare smoking-restricted areas with control areas and found no associations between smoking bans and short-term declines in heart attack rates. The authors have also analyzed smaller studies using subsamples and revealed that large short-term increases in myocardial infarction incidence following a smoking ban are as common as the large decreases.

=== Effects upon tobacco consumption ===
Smoking bans are generally acknowledged to reduce rates of smoking; smoke-free workplaces reduce smoking rates among workers, and restrictions upon smoking in public places reduce general smoking rates through a combination of stigmatisation and reduction in the social cues for smoking. The World Health Organization considers smoking bans to influence reducing demand for tobacco by producing an environment where smoking becomes increasingly more difficult and to help shift social norms away from the acceptance of smoking in everyday life. Along with tax measures, cessation measures, and education, smoking bans are viewed by public health experts as an important element in reducing smoking rates and promoting positive health outcomes. When effectively implemented, they are seen as an important element of policy to support behaviour change in favour of a healthy lifestyle.

One report stated that cigarette sales in Ireland and Scotland increased after their smoking bans were implemented. In contrast, another report states that in Ireland, cigarette sales fell by 16% in the six months after implementation of the ban. In the UK, cigarette sales fell by 11% during July 2007, the first month of the nationwide smoking ban, compared with July 2006.

A 1992 document from Phillip Morris summarised the tobacco industry's concern about the effects of smoking bans: "Total prohibition of smoking in the workplace strongly effects [sic] tobacco industry volume. Smokers facing these restrictions consume 11%–15% less than average and quit at a rate that is 84% higher than average."

In the United States, the CDC reported a levelling-off of smoking rates in recent years despite a large number of ever more comprehensive smoking bans and large tax increases. It has also been suggested that a "backstop" of hardcore smokers has been reached: those unmotivated and increasingly defiant in the face of further legislation. The smoking ban in New York City was credited with the reduction in adult smoking rates at nearly twice the rate as in the rest of the country, "and life expectancy has climbed three years in a decade".

Smoking restrictions may make it easier for smokers to quit. A survey suggests 22% of UK smokers may have considered quitting in response to that nation's smoking ban.

Restaurant smoking restrictions may help to stop young people from becoming habitual smokers. A study of Massachusetts youths, found that those in towns with smoking bans were 35 percent less likely to be habitual smokers.

=== Economic impact ===
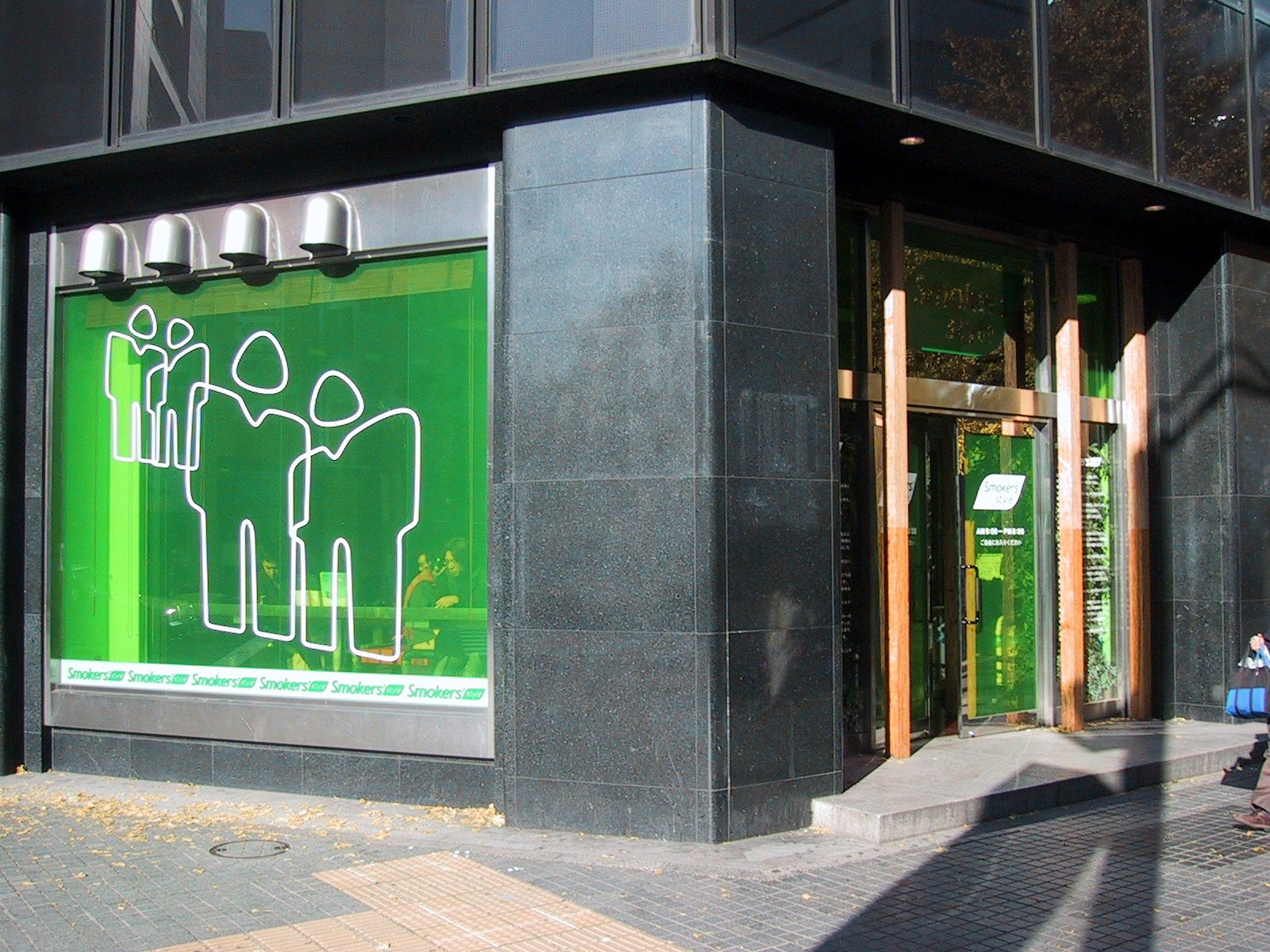
Smoking is forbidden on some streets in Japan. Smokers utilise smoking lounges, such as this one in Tokyo.

Many studies have been published in the health industry literature on the economic effects of smoking bans. The majority of these government and academic studies have found that there is no negative economic impact associated with smoking restrictions and many have found that there may be a positive effect on local businesses. A 2003 review of 97 such studies of the economic effects of a smoking ban on the hospitality industry found that the "best-designed" studies concluded that smoking bans did not harm businesses. Similarly, a 2014 meta-analysis found no significant gains or losses in revenue in restaurants and bars affected by smoking bans. In addition, such laws may reduce health care costs.

A Markov model can be used to estimate the economic impact of a generation smoking ban. The impact is claimed to depend on the value of a quality-adjusted life year. However the United States has rejected the use of QALYs.

Studies funded by the bar and restaurant associations have sometimes claimed that smoking bans hurt restaurant and bar profits. Such associations have also criticised studies which found that such legislation had no impact. Many bar and restaurant associations have relationships with the tobacco industry and are sponsored by them.

==== Australia ====
A government survey in Sydney found that the proportion of the population attending pubs and clubs rose after smoking was banned inside them. However, a ClubsNSW report in August 2008 blamed the smoking ban for New South Wales clubs suffering their worst fall in income ever, amounting to a decline of $385 million. Income for clubs was down 11% in New South Wales. Sydney CBD club income fell 21.7% and Western Sydney clubs lost 15.5%.

==== Germany ====
Some smoking restrictions were introduced in German hotels, restaurants, and bars in 2008 and early 2009. The restaurant industry has claimed that some businesses in the states that restricted smoking in late 2007 (Lower Saxony, Baden-Württemberg, and Hessen) experienced reduced profits. The German Hotel and Restaurant Association (DEHOGA) claimed that the smoking ban deterred people from going out for a drink or meal, stating that 15% of establishments that adopted a ban in 2007 saw turnover fall by around 50%. However, a study by the University of Hamburg (Ahlfeldt and Maennig 2010) finds negative impacts on revenues, if any, only in the very short run. In the medium and long run, a recovery of revenues took place. These results suggest either that the consumption in bars and restaurants is not affected by smoking bans in the long run, or that negative revenue impacts from smokers are compensated by increasing revenues from non-smokers.

==== Ireland ====
The Republic of Ireland was the first country to introduce fully smoke-free workplaces (29 March 2004, after it was delayed from 1 January 2004). The Irish workplace smoke-free law was introduced to protect workers from secondhand smoke and to discourage smoking in a nation with a high percentage of smokers. In Ireland, the main opposition to the ban came from publicans. Many pubs introduced "outdoor" arrangements (generally heated areas with shelters). It was speculated by opponents that the smoke-free workplaces law would increase the amount of drinking and smoking in the home, but recent studies showed this was not the case.

Ireland's Office of Tobacco Control website indicates that "an evaluation of the official hospitality sector data shows there has been no adverse economic effect from the introduction of this measure (the March 2004 national smoking ban in bars, restaurants, etc), despite claims that the smoke-free law was a significant contributing factor to the closure of hundreds of small rural pubs, with almost 440 fewer licences renewed in 2006 than in 2005."

==== United Kingdom ====
Smoking bans were enacted in Scotland on 26 March 2006, in Wales on 2 April 2007, in Northern Ireland on 30 April 2007, and in England on 1 July 2007. The legislation was cited as an example of good regulation which has had a favourable impact on the UK economy by the Department for Business, Innovation and Skills, and a review of the impact of smoke-free legislation carried out for the Department of Health concluded that there was no clear adverse impact on the hospitality industry despite initial criticism from some voices within the pub trade.

Six months after implementation in Wales, the Licensed Victuallers Association (LVA), which represents pub operators across Wales, stated that pubs had lost up to 20% of their trade. The LVA said some businesses were on the brink of closure, others had already closed down, and there was little optimism that trade would eventually return to previous levels.

The British Beer and Pub Association (BBPA), which represents some pubs and breweries across the UK, said that beer sales were at their lowest level since the 1930s, ascribing a fall in sales of 7% during 2007 to the smoke-free regulations.

According to a survey conducted by pub and bar trade magazine The Publican, the anticipated increase in sales of food following the introduction of smoke-free workplaces did not immediately occur. The trade magazine's survey of 303 pubs in the United Kingdom found the average customer spent £14.86 on food and drink at dinner in 2007, virtually identical to 2006.

A survey conducted by BII (formerly British Institute of Innkeeping) and the Federation of Licensed Victuallers' Associations (FLVA) concluded that sales had decreased by 7.3% in the 5 months since the introduction of smoke-free workplaces on 1 July 2007. Of the 2,708 responses to the survey, 58% of licensees said they had seen smokers visiting less regularly, while 73% had seen their smoking customers spending less time at the pub.

==== United States ====
In the US, smokers and hospitality businesses initially argued that businesses would suffer from no-smoking laws. However, a 2006 review by the U.S. Surgeon General found that smoking restrictions were unlikely to harm businesses in practice, and that many restaurants and bars might see increased business.

In 2003, New York City amended its smoke-free law to include virtually all restaurants and bars, including those in private clubs, making it, along with the California smoke-free law, one of the toughest in the United States. The city's Department of Health found in a 2004 study that air pollution levels had decreased sixfold in bars and restaurants after the restrictions went into effect, and that New Yorkers had reported less secondhand smoke in the workplace. The study also found the city's restaurants and bars prospered despite the smoke-free law, with increases in jobs, liquor licenses, and business tax payments. The president of the New York Nightlife Association remarked that the study was not wholly representative, as by not differentiating between restaurants and nightclubs, the reform may have caused businesses like nightclubs and bars to suffer instead. A 2006 study by the New York State Department of Health found that "the CIAA has not had any significant negative financial effect on restaurants and bars in either the short or the long term".

Some jurisdictions have granted hardship exemptions to smoking bans for businesses that have demonstrated financial suffering because of the law. A bar in Washington, D.C. received the first hardship exemption in 2007. In Wauwatosa, Wisconsin, three restaurants received short-term exemptions from a local smoke-free ordinance when they managed to demonstrate economic loss. Maryland also has provisions for hardship exemptions.

=== Effects upon musical instruments ===
Bellows-driven instruments – such as the accordion, concertina, melodeon and (Irish) Uilleann bagpipes – reportedly need less frequent cleaning and maintenance as a result of the Irish smoke-free law. "Third-hand smoke", solid particulates from secondhand smoke that are adsorbed onto surfaces and later re-emitted as gases or transferred through touch, are a particular problem for musicians. After playing in smoky bars, instruments can emit nicotine, 3-ethenylpyridine (3-EP), phenol, cresols, naphthalene, formaldehyde, and tobacco-specific nitrosamines (including some not found in freshly-emitted tobacco smoke), which can enter musicians' bodies through the skin, or be re-emitted as gases after they have left the smoky environment. Concern about third-hand smoke on instruments is one of the reasons many musicians, represented by the New Orleans Musicians' Clinic, supported the smoking ban there.

=== Effects of prison smoking restrictions ===
Prisons are increasingly restricting tobacco smoking. In the United States, 24 states prohibit indoor smoking whereas California, Nebraska, Arkansas, and Kentucky prohibit smoking on the entire prison grounds. In July 2004 the Federal Bureau of Prisons adopted a smoke-free policy for its facilities. The 1993 U.S. Supreme Court ruling in Helling v. McKinney acknowledged that a prisoner's exposure to secondhand smoke could be regarded as cruel and unusual punishment (which would be in violation of the Eighth Amendment). A 1997 ruling in Massachusetts established that prison smoking bans do not constitute cruel and unusual punishment. Many officials view prison smoking bans as a means of reducing health-care costs.

Except for Quebec, all Canadian provinces have banned smoking indoors and outdoors in all their prison facilities. Prison officials and guards are sometimes worried due to previous events in other prisons concerning riots, fostering a cigarette black market within the prison, and other problems resulting from total prison smoking restrictions. Prisons have experienced riots when placing smoking restrictions into effect, resulting in prisoners setting fires and destroying prison property, and persons being assaulted, injured, and stabbed. One prison in Canada had some guards reporting breathing difficulties from the fumes of prisoners smoking artificial cigarettes made from nicotine patches lit by creating sparks from inserting metal objects into electrical outlets. For example in 2008, the Orsainville Detention Centre near Quebec City, withdrew its smoke-free provision following a riot. But the feared increase in tension and violence expected in association with smoking restrictions has generally not been experienced in practice.

Prison smoking bans are also in force in New Zealand, the Isle of Man and the Australian states of Victoria, Queensland, Tasmania, Northern Territory and New South Wales. The New Zealand ban was subsequently successfully challenged in court on two occasions, resulting in a law change to maintain it.

Some prisoners are getting around the prison smoking bans by producing and smoking "teabacco", which is nicotine patches or lozenges mixed with tea leaves, and rolled up in Bible paper. A forensic analysis of teabacco made from nicotine lozenges identified some potentially-toxic compounds, but concluded that teabacco made from nicotine lozenges may be less harmful than traditional tobacco cigarettes.

=== Compliance ===
The introduction of smoking restrictions occasionally generates protests and predictions of widespread non-compliance, along with the rise of smokeasies, including in New York City, Germany, Illinois, the United Kingdom, Utah, and Washington, D.C..

High levels of compliance with smoke-free laws have been reported in most jurisdictions including New York, Ireland, Italy and Scotland. Poor compliance was reported in Kolkata. A 2024 systematic review and meta-analysis of 23 studies estimated pooled non-compliance with smoke-free laws at 48.0% (95% CI 33.9–62.2), with the highest non-compliance observed in hotels (59%).

A February 2021 study (based on fieldwork done from August to September 2020) reported that in all countries except Croatia, less than half of the respondents reported seeing people smoking inside the last time they visited a drinking establishment, such as a bar. Croatia stands out with 73% of respondents indicating this. In other countries, the proportions range from 47% in Cyprus, 45% in Slovakia, and 31% in Denmark, to only 3% in Sweden, 5% in Hungary, and 7% in Austria. These results indicate that despite the presence of indoor smoking bans across the EU, indoor tobacco smoke in drinking establishments remains an issue in several countries.

== Criticism ==
Smoke-free regulations and ordinances have been criticised on a number of grounds.

=== Government interference with personal lifestyle ===
Critics of smoke-free provisions, including musician Joe Jackson, and political essayist Christopher Hitchens, have claimed that regulation efforts are misguided. Typically, such arguments are based upon an interpretation of John Stuart Mill's harm principle which perceives smoke-free laws as an obstacle to tobacco consumption per se, rather than a bar upon harming other people.

Such arguments, which usually refer to the notion of personal liberty, have themselves been criticised by Nobel Prize-winning economist Amartya Sen who defended smoke-free regulations on several grounds. Among other things, Sen argued that while a person may be free to acquire the habit of smoking, they thereby restrict their own freedom in the future given that the habit of smoking is hard to break. Sen also pointed out the heavy costs that smoking inevitably imposes on every society which grants smokers unrestricted access to public services (which, Sen noted, every society that is not "monstrously unforgiving" would do). Arguments which invoke the notion of personal liberty against smoke-free laws are thus incomplete and inadequate, according to Sen.

In New Zealand, two psychiatrist patients and a nurse took their local district health board to court, arguing a smoking ban at intensive care units violated "human dignity" as they were there for mental health reasons, not smoking-related illness. They argued it was "cruel" to deny patients cigarettes.

=== Property rights ===
Some critics of smoke-free laws emphasise the property rights of business owners, drawing a distinction between nominally public places (such as government buildings) and privately owned establishments (such as bars and restaurants). Citing economic efficiency, some economists suggest that the basic institutions of private property rights and contractual freedom are capable of resolving conflicts between the preferences of smokers and those who seek a smoke-free environment, without government intrusion.

=== Legality of smoke-free regulations ===
Businesses affected by smoke-free regulations have filed lawsuits claiming that these are unconstitutional or otherwise illegal. In the United States, some cite unequal protection under the law while others cite loss of business without compensation, as well as other types of challenges. Some localities where hospitality businesses filed lawsuits against the state or local government include Nevada, Montana, Iowa, Colorado, Kentucky, New York, South Carolina, and Hawaii, though none have succeeded.

=== Moving of smoking elsewhere ===
Restrictions upon smoking in offices and other enclosed public places often result in smokers going outside to smoke, frequently congregating outside doorways. Many jurisdictions that have restricted smoking in enclosed public places have extended provisions to cover areas within a fixed distance of entrances to buildings.

The former UK Secretary of State for Health John Reid claimed that restrictions upon smoking in public places may lead to more people smoking at home. However, both the House of Commons Health Committee and the Royal College of Physicians disagreed, with the former finding no evidence to support Reid's claim after studying Ireland, and the latter finding that smoke-free households increased from 22% to 37% between 1996 and 2003.

=== Connection to drunk driving fatalities ===
In May 2008, research published by Adams and Cotti in the Journal of Public Economics examined statistics of drunken-driving fatalities and accidents in areas where smoke-free laws have been implemented in bars and found that fatal drunken-driving accidents increased by about 13%, or about 2.5 such accidents per year for a typical county of 680,000. They speculate this could be caused by smokers driving farther away to jurisdictions without smoke-free laws or where enforcement is lax.

=== Effects of funding on research literature ===
As in other areas of research, the effect of funding on research literature has been discussed with respect to smoke-free laws. Most commonly, studies which found few or no positive and/or negative effects of smoke-free laws and which were funded by tobacco companies have been delegitimised because of the obvious conflict of interest.

Professor of Economics at the California State Polytechnic University-San Luis Obispo, Michael L. Marlow, defended "tobacco-sponsored" studies arguing that all studies merited "scrutiny and a degree of skepticism", irrespective of their funding. He wished for the basic assumption that every author were "fair minded and trustworthy, and deserves being heard out" and for less attention to research funding when evaluating the results of a study. Marlow suggests that studies funded by tobacco companies are viewed and dismissed as "deceitful", i.e. as being driven by (conscious) bad intention.

== Alternatives ==
=== Incentives for voluntarily smoke-free establishments ===
During the debates over the Washington, DC, smoke-free law, city council member Carol Schwartz proposed legislation that would have enacted either a substantial tax credit for businesses that chose to voluntarily restrict smoking or a quadrupling of the annual business license fee for bars, restaurants and clubs that wished to allow smoking. Additionally, locations allowing smoking would have been required to install specified high-performance ventilation systems.

=== Ventilation ===
Critics of smoke-free laws have suggested that ventilation is a means of reducing the harmful effects of secondhand smoke. A tobacco industry-funded study conducted by the School of Technology of the University of Glamorgan in Wales, published in the Building Services Journal suggested that "ventilation is effective in controlling the level of contamination", although "ventilation can only dilute or partially displace contaminants and occupational exposure limits are based on the 'as low as reasonably practicable' principle".

Some hospitality organisations have claimed that ventilation systems could bring venues into line with smoke-free restaurant ordinances. A study published by the American Society of Heating, Refrigerating and Air-Conditioning Engineers and funded by the Robert Wood Johnson Foundation found one establishment with lower air quality in the non-smoking section, due to improperly installed ventilation systems. They also determined that even properly functioning systems "are not substitutes for smoking bans in controlling environmental smoke exposure".

The tobacco industry has focused on proposing ventilation as an alternative to smoke-free laws, though this approach has not been widely adopted in the U.S. because "in the end, it is simpler, cheaper, and healthier to end smoking". The Italian smoke-free law permits dedicated smoking rooms with automatic doors and smoke extractors. Nevertheless, few Italian establishments are creating smoking rooms due to the additional cost.

A landmark report from the U.S. Surgeon General found that even the use of elaborate ventilation systems and smoking rooms fail to provide protection from the health hazards of secondhand smoke, since there is "no safe level of secondhand smoke".

== See also ==
=== General ===
- Smoking bans in private vehicles
- List of smoke-free colleges and universities
- Tobacco control
- Tobacco fatwa
- A Counterblaste to Tobacco
- Blue law
- Indoor air quality

=== Organizations ===
- Action on Smoking and Health
- Airspace Action on Smoking and Health
- Anti-Cigarette League of America
- FOREST (A UK pro-tobacco group)

=== People ===
- Douglas Eads Foster, Los Angeles, California, City Council member, 1927–29, proposed prohibition of smoking near schools
- Lucy Page Gaston, American leader early 20th century
- Evan Lewis, Los Angeles City Council member, 1925–41, opposed smoking on balconies of theaters
- Adolf Hitler, 1889–1945, often considered to be the first national leader to advocate against smoking
- Patricia Hewitt introduced bans in UK
- Nicola Roxon introduced plain packaging in Australia
