= List of people from Harvey, Illinois =

The following list includes notable people who were born or have lived in Harvey, Illinois. For a similar list organized alphabetically by last name, see the category page People from Harvey, Illinois.

== Arts and culture ==
- Nina Chanel Abney (1982– ), painter
- Ivan Albright (1897–1983), magic realist, painter, and artist
- Paris Barclay (1956– ), two-time Emmy-winning television director and producer
- Michael Boatman (1964–), actor and writer
- Damarr Brown, James Beard Award-winning chef
- Ed Cassidy (1923–2012), rock and jazz drummer, member of Spirit
- The Dells (1952– ), Rock and Roll Hall of Fame singing group started at Thornton High School in Harvey
- Tom Dreesen (1942– ), stand-up comedian
- Nelsan Ellis (1978–2017), actor and playwright
- Lupe Fiasco (1982– ), rapper
- Edward Page Gaston (1868–1956), journalist and temperance activist
- Lucy Page Gaston (1860–1924), anti-tobacco activist
- LaRoyce Hawkins (1988– ), actor, Chicago P.D.
- Bill Hayes (1925–2024), actor and singer
- Kevin Huizenga (1977– ), cartoonist
- J. B. Hutto (1926–1983), musician in Blues Hall of Fame
- Syleena Johnson (1976– ), Grammy-nominated singer-songwriter
- Sharon Lewis (1952– ), blues vocalist
- VaShawn Mitchell (1974– ), gospel singer
- KeKe Palmer (1993– ), Emmy-winning actress and musician
- Dandrell Scott (1984– ), rapper and voiceover actor
- Willie Taylor (1981– ), singer, member of DAY26
- Newton Thornburg (1929–2011), novelist and screenwriter
- Nick Vincent (1958– ), musician and composer
- Mark Weiser (1952–1999), computer scientist, drummer of Severe Tire Damage
- Steven Whitehurst (1967– ), author
- Jaboukie Young-White (1994– ), stand-up comedian and writer
- Danitra Vance , (1954-1994) died of Breast Cancer, actress and comedian was an alum of SNL attended Thornton High

== Politics ==
- Flora Ciarlo (1936– ), member of the Illinois House of Representatives; born in Harvey
- Frederic R. DeYoung (1875–1934), served as a judge on the Illinois Supreme Court, Superior Court of Cook County, and the original Circuit Court of Cook County, and served as a member of the Illinois House of Representatives
- William E. McVey (1885–1958), member of the United States House of Representatives from Illinois's 4th congressional district; while in Congress, he resided at 15616 Lexington Avenue

== Religion ==
- Ronald Hicks (1967– ), born in Harvey, archbishop of New York, previously bishop of Joliet (2020–2025)
- Louis Tylka (1970– ), born in Harvey, bishop of the Roman Catholic Diocese of Peoria, Illinois (2022– ), previously coadjutor bishop of Peoria (2020–2022)

== Sports ==
=== Baseball ===
- Lou Boudreau (1917–2001), Hall of Fame shortstop for the Cleveland Indians and Boston Red Sox; manager and broadcaster
- Jeff Duncan (1978– ), outfielder for the New York Mets
- John Ely (1986– ), pitcher for the Los Angeles Dodgers
- Justin Huisman (1979– ), pitcher for the Kansas City Royals
- Garrett Jones (1981– ), player for the Minnesota Twins and Pittsburgh Pirates
- Eric Knott (1974– ), pitcher for the Arizona Diamondbacks and Montreal Expos
- Don Robertson (1930–2014), right fielder for the Chicago Cubs
- Pete Stanicek (1963– ), second baseman and left fielder for the Baltimore Orioles
- Dizzy Trout (1915–1972), pitcher for 1945 World Series champion Detroit Tigers; died in Harvey

=== Basketball ===
- Jim Ard (1948– ), basketball player for Boston Celtics; attended Thornton High in Harvey
- Lloyd Batts (1951– ), basketball player for University of Cincinnati; attended Thornton High in Harvey
- Leon Clark (1943– ), basketball player; attended Thornton High in Harvey
- Eddy Curry (1982– ), center for four NBA teams
- Kevin Duckworth (1964–2008), center for five NBA teams
- Melvin Ely (1978– ), center and power forward for five NBA teams; NBA champion (2007); born in Harvey
- Mustapha Farrakhan, Jr. (1988– ), basketball player; grandson of Nation of Islam leader Louis Farrakhan
- Reggie Hamilton (1989– ), basketball player
- Ariel McDonald (1972– ), basketball player; 2000 Israeli Basketball Premier League MVP; former Slovenian national player

=== Football ===
- Ted Albrecht (1954– ), lineman for Chicago Bears
- Ed Beinor (1917–1991), tackle for 1942 NFL champion Washington Redskins
- Antwaan Randle El (1979– ), wide receiver and punt returner for Super Bowl XL champion Pittsburgh Steelers, Washington Redskins, Pittsburgh Steelers, and New England Patriots; attended Thornton High in Harvey
- Barry Gardner (1976– ), linebacker for Philadelphia Eagles, Cleveland Browns, New York Jets, and New England Patriots
- Richard Johnson (1963– ), All-American cornerback at University of Wisconsin–Madison and with Houston Oilers
- Jim Smith (1955– ), wide receiver for Pittsburgh Steelers and Los Angeles Raiders; two-time Super Bowl champion
- Tai Streets (1977– ), wide receiver for San Francisco 49ers; attended Thornton High in Harvey

=== Other ===
- Dana Schoenfield (1953– ), swimmer, 1972 Olympic silver medalist; born in Harvey
