= Evora (disambiguation) =

Evora or Évora may refer to:

== People ==
=== First name ===
- Evora Bucknum (1851–1929), American educator, cookbook writer, and missionary

=== Surname ===
- Affonso Évora (born 1918), Brazilian basketball player
- Amanda Evora (born 1984), American pairs skater
- César Évora (born 1959), Cuban actor
- Cesária Évora (1941–2011), Cape Verde singer
- Gala Évora (born 1983), Spanish singer and actress
- Nelson Évora (born 1984), Portuguese track and field athlete

== Places ==
- Évora, a city in the Alentejo area of Portugal
- Évora (district), the political district of which the city of Évora is the capital
- Evora, Queensland, a locality in the Barcaldine Region

== Other ==
- Evora, a genus of moth
- Lotus Evora, British sports car, launched 2008.
