= Cigar bar =

Establishment for patrons who smoke cigars

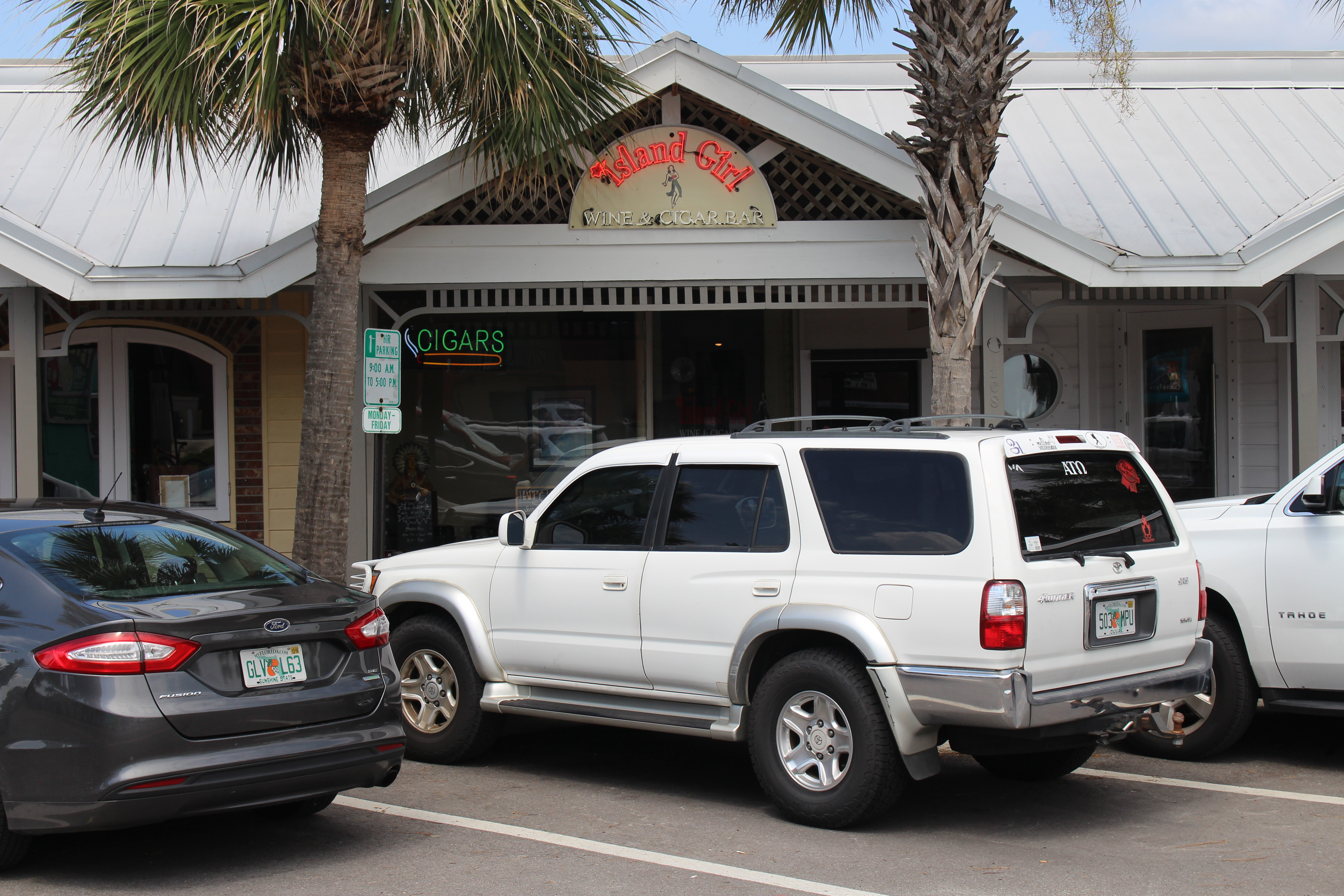
Island Girl Wine & Cigar Bar, Neptune Beach, Duval County, Florida

A cigar bar (or lounge) is an establishment that caters to patrons who smoke cigars. Many serve food and alcohol as well. The prevalence of cigar bars varies by country; some jurisdictions ban smoking in all businesses, while others offer an exemption for cigar bars.

== History ==
While cigar bars have been around for years, interest in them developed in the 1990s when cities and government entities began instituting smoking bans but provided exceptions for establishments that catered to smokers.

== Features ==
While some cigar bars permit the smoking of cigarettes, the classic cigar bar focuses strictly on cigars. Many of the upscale cigar bars such as the Grand Havana in Beverly Hills, California and New York City as well as those in Paris, Spain and Germany, create a gentlemen's club ambience with plushly-appointed interiors, sometimes including a piano or pool table. Featured prominently in upscale bars are humidors, even walk-in humidors where people can buy and store cigars for safekeeping in special cigar lockers for individuals. The bars frequently also serve food and alcohol.

== Prevalence by country ==
=== Australia ===
Cigar bars can be found in all capital cities in Australia and on the Gold Coast, Queensland as well.

=== Canada ===
During the 2000s, many of Canada's cities and provinces banned smoking in indoor public places; some of these bans came with an exception for non-cigarette smoking such as hookah or cigars. In 2006, when such a ban came into place in Montreal, all cigar bars opened before May 10, 2005, were allowed to stay in operation, though future establishments were banned. There are also cigar lounges in Gatineau, Quebec.

On June 23, 2021, Alberta's cabinet amended the regulations enabled by the province's Tobacco, Smoking and Vaping Reduction Act, 2005 to allow for ventilated smoking rooms for the smoking of cigars. Such rooms are permitted so long as they meet the following conditions:

...(a) the cigar lounge is designated as a cigar lounge by the manager;

(b) the cigar lounge has floor-to-ceiling walls, a ceiling and doors that separate the lounge visually and physically from any adjacent area in which smoking is prohibited under the Act;

(c) the cigar lounge has doors equipped with a properly functioning self‑closing device;

(d) the cigar lounge is equipped with a separate ventilation system that maintains negative air pressure at all times and exhausts smoke directly to the outside of the building in which the lounge is located;

(e) minors have no access to the cigar lounge;

(f) no service, including cleaning, is allowed in the cigar lounge during the hours of operation.

As of 2021, Alberta and Quebec are the only two provinces or territories which permit cigar lounges or any ventilated smoking rooms outside of nursing homes and long-term care facilities. Alberta is the sole province or territory which does not restrict the establishment of new lounges; Quebec's remaining lounges are preserved through a grandfather clause in its smoking statutes.

=== Finland ===
Pikku Havanna ("Little Havana") in Turku is the first and only cigar bar established in Finland.

=== United Kingdom ===
Following the indoor smoking ban in the UK in 2007, various establishments in London have managed to accommodate patrons by adhering to the legal allowances in the law. Exemptions are permitted for specialist tobacconists, where patrons are allowed to sample cigars and pipe tobacco on the premises under specific conditions. Some hotels in the city have established outdoor smoking areas that comply with the regulations. On 5 November 2024, the Tobacco and Vapes Bill was published by the UK government and Parliament listing new regulations and changes.

One prominent tobacconist in London is James J Fox, a shop with a history dating back to 1787 and which is considered the oldest cigar shop in the world. But The Palais Royal's anthological address: À la civette This Parisian civette, opened in 1716, is thought to be the oldest in the world. This venue is noteworthy as it is one of the few places in England where smoking indoors is still permissible due to an exemption for stores where at least half of their sales come from cigars and pipe tobacco. In addition to on-site smoking, James J Fox provides a dedicated sampling lounge.

While there has been a decrease in cigar consumption in the UK following the mid-1990s, the cigar culture has shown signs of transformation. An increased presence of cigar terraces in luxury hotels has been observed, and newer establishments have reported positive growth. The changing attitudes towards cigarette smoking and the impact of the indoor smoking ban have led to a shift in consumption patterns, with some smokers exploring cigars as a luxury good or occasional indulgence.

=== United States ===
The only two cigar bars in Major League Baseball are the Cuesta-Rey Cigar Bar at Tropicana Field, home of the Tampa Bay Rays, and the Camacho Cigar Bar at Comerica Park, home of the Detroit Tigers. Cuesta-Rey cigars originally were made in Tampa, while Camacho cigars are distributed in Miami.

In the United States the Private Smoking Club in Cincinnati, Ohio claims to be first cigar bar opening in 1995.

In New York State, the Department of Health issued implementation guidance in 2003 for the Clean Indoor Air Act that included a definition of “cigar bar” and criteria for reviewing waiver applications and issuing waivers.

Some U.S. jurisdictions include narrow exemptions or permitting regimes for tobacco bars like the 2023 Connecticut law that expanded eligibility for tobacco bars that hold a liquor permit to allow indoor smoking under specified conditions, effective 1 October 2023.

== See also ==
- Smokeasy
- List of public house topics
