= Evora Bucknum Perkins =

American educator and cookbook writer (1851–1929)

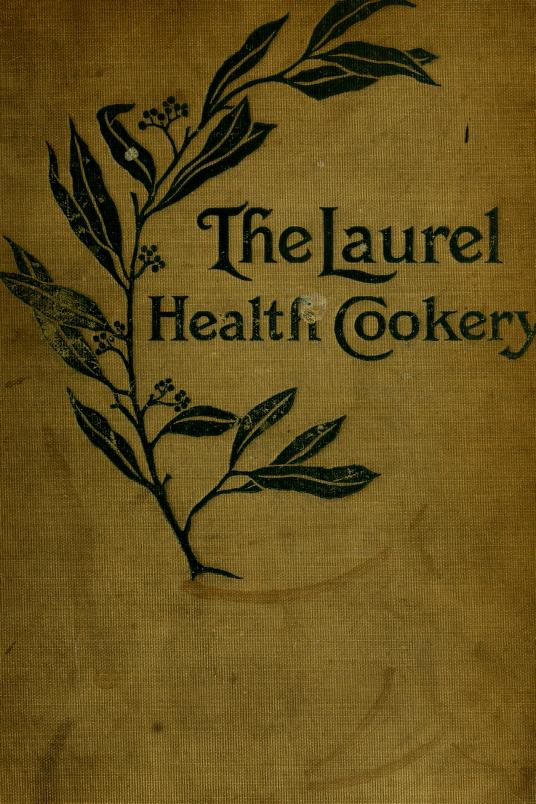
- Cover of The Laurel Health Cookery (1911)
- Born: Evora Bucknum; November 12, 1851; Palmer, Michigan, U.S.
- Died: January 14, 1929 (aged 77); Montclair, New Jersey, U.S.
- Resting place: Lindenwood Cemetery, Stoneham, Massachusetts; 42.48280°N 71.10890°W
- Occupations: Educator; cookbook writer; restaurateur; missionary
- Spouse: Frank A. Perkins (m. 1901)

Evora Bucknum Perkins (born Evora Bucknum; November 12, 1851 – January 14, 1929) was an American educator, cookbook writer, restaurateur, and missionary affiliated with the Seventh-day Adventist Church. She taught vegetarian cookery and hygiene, worked in Adventist sanitarium and missionary settings, and managed vegetarian restaurants. In 1911, she published The Laurel Health Cookery, a vegetarian cookbook based on her work as a cooking instructor.

== Biography ==
=== Early and personal life ===
Evora Bucknum Perkins was born Evora Bucknum on November 12, 1851, in Palmer, Michigan, to Amasa M. Bucknum, a physician, and Irene Jane Bucknum (née Eddy; d. 1868).

Perkins married Frank A. Perkins on May 12, 1901, in Lancaster, Massachusetts. He worked as a cook at the New England Sanitarium in South Lancaster, Massachusetts. The couple worked together in the sanitarium for 15 years.

=== Career ===
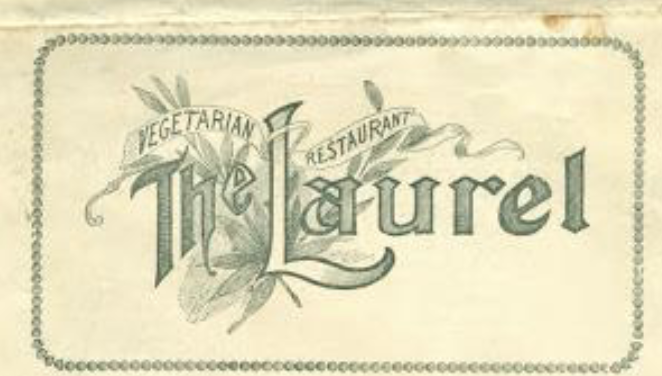
Logo for The Laurel Vegetarian Restaurant, New York City, where Perkins served as manager

Perkins was a Seventh-day Adventist and was described in an obituary as the first missionary nurse to operate on a self-supporting basis. She worked with Adventist health advocates including Daniel H. Kress, Lauretta E. Kress, and Stephen N. Haskell.

Between August 21, 1889, and January 1, 1896, Perkins conducted 825 lectures and lessons on cooking, gave 20 talks on healthful dress, and instructed about 3,000 people. She served as assistant teacher at the Battle Creek Sanitarium's cooking school and took part in a cooking school led by Ella Eaton Kellogg at Bay View during the summers of 1891 and 1892. After beginning independent missionary work in 1892, she focused mainly on teaching hygienic cookery to private students and nurses in Detroit, which became her main source of income. She also worked as a cooking teacher in Bay City, Michigan.

Perkins was involved in the establishment of vegetarian restaurants in Detroit, Washington, D.C., and Boston, and worked in health and cooking schools. She also served as manager of The Laurel Vegetarian Restaurant in New York City.

In later years, she continued missionary work, including distributing religious literature in Verona, New York.

=== The Laurel Health Cookery ===
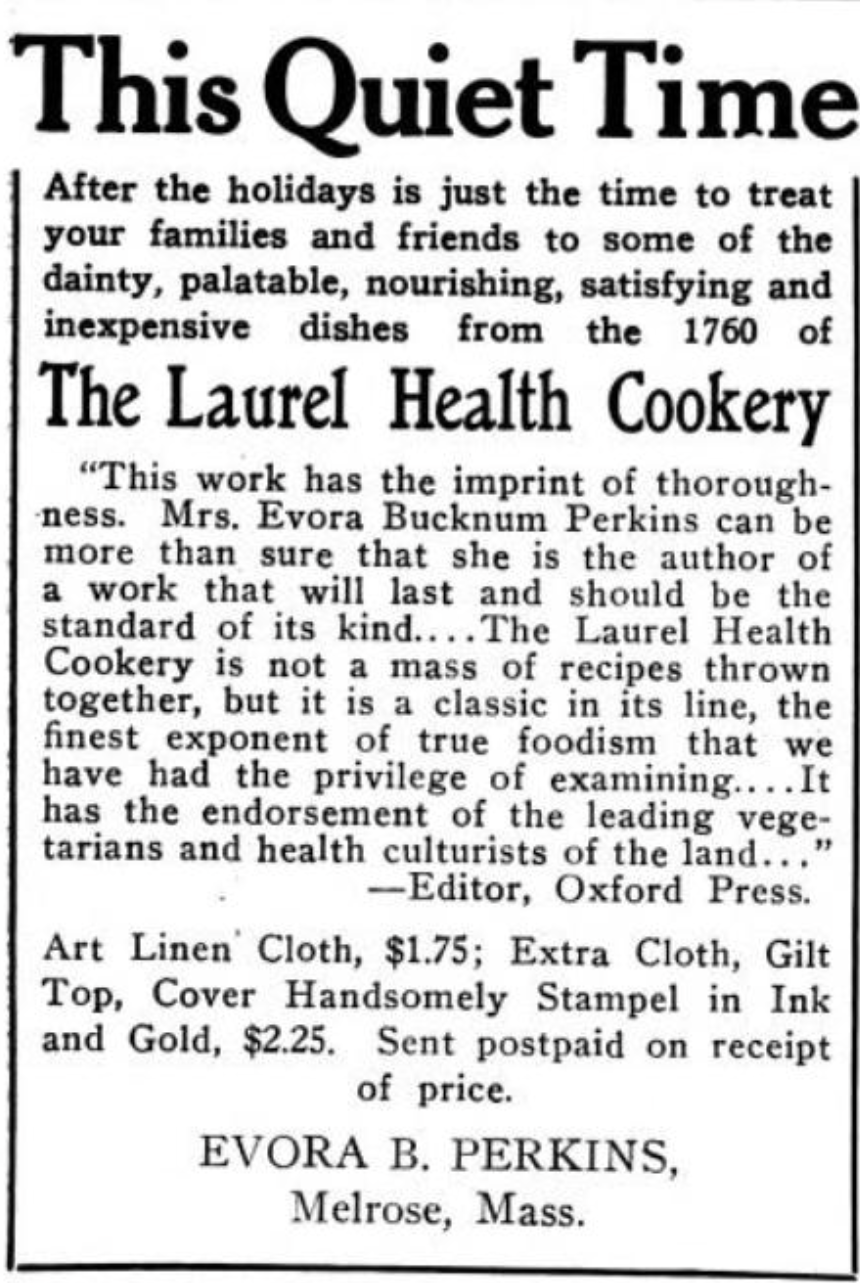
Advertisement for The Laurel Health Cookery, 1913

Perkins published the vegetarian cookbook The Laurel Health Cookery in 1911. The book contains 1,760 recipes compiled from her work as a cooking instructor in schools and sanitariums in the United States. It includes vegetarian recipes, health notes, and advice on cleanliness.

In the book, "True Meats" refers to plant-based protein sources such as nuts, including peanuts, pine nuts, and almonds, as well as coconut milk, lentils, beans, and eggs. Dishes labelled "Trumese" and "Nutmese" mainly use commercially processed nut products. One chapter is devoted to mushrooms. For people avoiding eggs, described in the book as "parochial vegetarians", egg-free alternatives are included. The book describes coffee, tea, and hot chocolate as unhealthy and recommends drinks including fruit nectars, lemonade, cranberry juice, and bran tea.

=== Death ===
Perkins died on January 14, 1929, in Montclair, New Jersey, after influenza developed into pneumonia. She was buried at Lindenwood Cemetery, Stoneham, Massachusetts, on May 13.

== Publications ==
- The Laurel Health Cookery (Melrose, Massachusetts: The Laurel Publishing Company, 1911)
