= Speakeasy =

Establishment that illegally sells alcoholic beverages, or retro-style bars

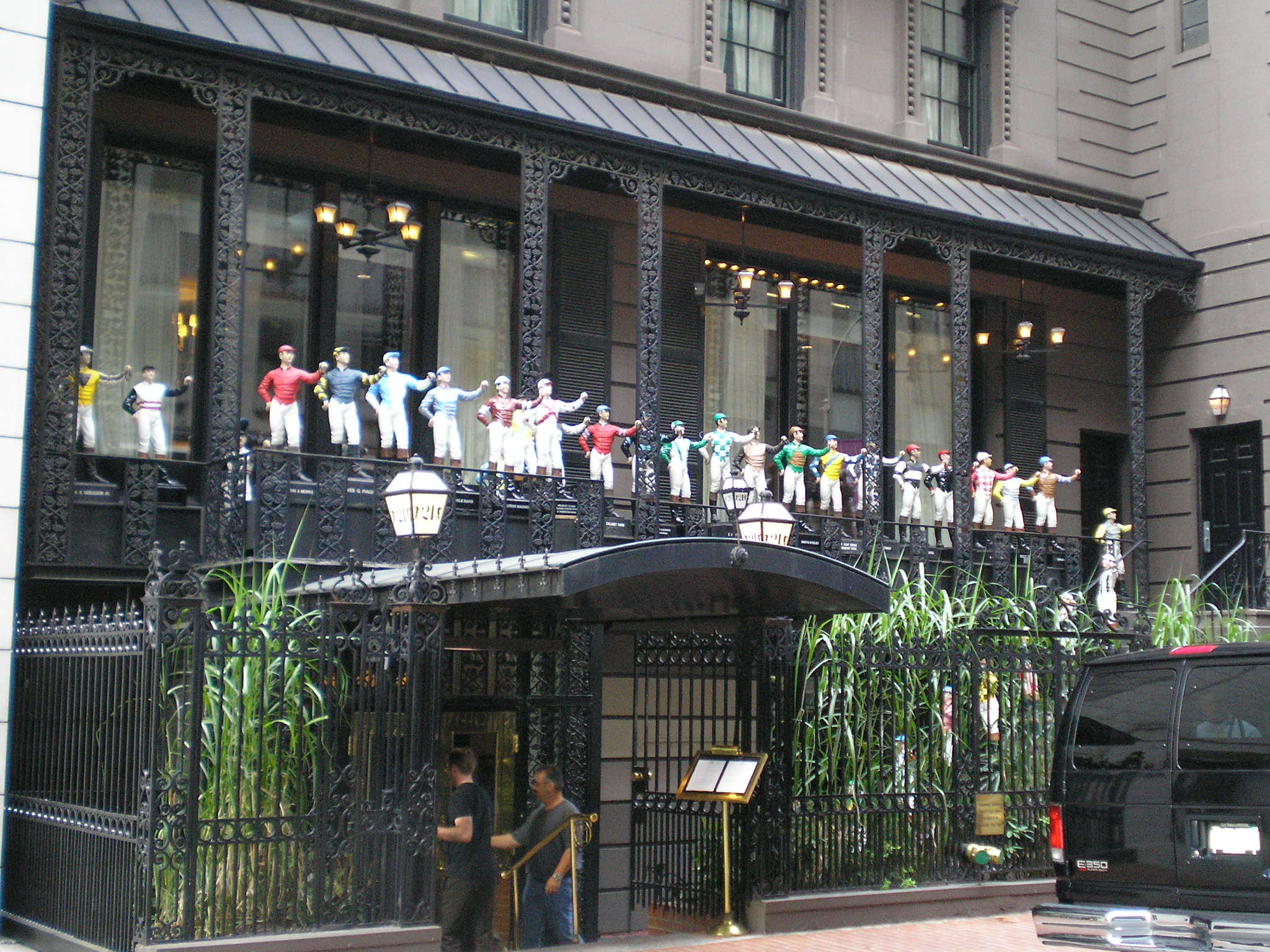
New York's 21 Club was a Prohibition-era speakeasy.

A speakeasy, also called a beer flat, blind pig, or blind tiger, was an illicit establishment that sold alcoholic beverages. The term may also refer to a retro style bar that replicates aspects of historical speakeasies.

In the United States, speakeasy bars date back to at least the 1880s, but came into prominence in the United States during the Prohibition era (1920–1933, longer in some states). During that time, the sale, manufacture, and transportation (bootlegging) of alcoholic beverages was illegal throughout the United States, due to the Eighteenth Amendment to the United States Constitution. Speakeasies largely disappeared after Prohibition ended in 1933. A speakeasy-style trend began in 2000 with the opening of the bar Milk & Honey.

== Etymology ==
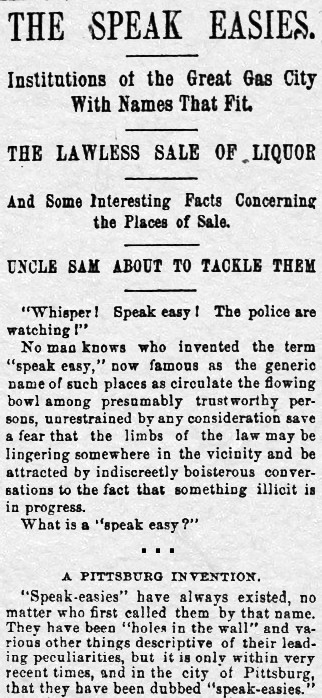
One of the earliest recorded uses of the term in the United States. Pittsburg Dispatch, June 30, 1889

The phrase "speak softly shop", meaning a "smuggler's house", appeared in a British slang dictionary published in 1823. The similar phrase "speak easy shop", denoting a place where unlicensed liquor sales were made, appeared in a British naval memoir written in 1844. The precise term "speakeasy" dates from no later than 1837 when an article in the Sydney Herald newspaper in Australia referred to 'sly-grog shops', created the idiom "speakeasy's" [sic] in this part – Boro Creek.'

In the United States, the word emerged in the 1880s. The first known recorded use is in a Harrisburg, Pennsylvania newspaper article from March 21, 1889, which refers to "speak easy" as the term used in the Pittsburgh-area town of McKeesport, Pennsylvania for "a saloon that sells without a license". A later, June 30, 1889, Pittsburg Dispatch article explains the following:

"Speak-easies" have always existed, no matter who first called them by that name. They have been "holes in the wall" and various other things descriptive of their leading peculiarities, but it is only within very recent times, and in the city of Pittsburgh, that they have been dubbed "speak-easies".

Speakeasies were "so called because of the practice of speaking quietly about such a place in public, or when inside it, so as not to alert the police or neighbors". Although failing to account for earlier usage outside the U.S., The New York Times attributes the term to saloon owner Kate Hester, who ran an unlicensed bar in the 1880s in McKeesport, supposedly telling her rowdy customers to "speak easy" to avoid attention from authorities, which has become a common American anecdote. Many years later, in the Prohibition-era United States, the "speakeasy" became a common name to describe a place to get an illicit drink.

Different names for speakeasies were created. The terms "blind pig" and "blind tiger" originated in the United States in the 19th century. These terms were applied to establishments that sold alcoholic beverages illegally, and they are still in use today. The operator of an establishment (such as a saloon or bar) would charge customers to see an attraction (such as an animal) and then serve a "complimentary" alcoholic beverage, thus circumventing the law.

In desperate cases it has to betake itself to the exhibition of Greenland pigs and other curious animals, charging 25 cents for a sight of the pig and throwing in a gin cocktail gratuitously. [They] are in a mysterious place called a blind tiger, drinking the very bad whiskey for which Prohibition is indirectly responsible.

"Blind tiger" also referred to illegal drinking establishments in which the seller's identity was concealed. Hence the word “blind” since no one can see who the seller is.

A drawer runs into a wall of what appears to be a billiard saloon. You pull out the drawer, drop in your change, shove the drawer back, call for what you want and then pull out the drawer again and there it is, "Straight" or "Spiked" just as you'd have it. Nobody is heard or seen, and the blind tiger, apparently without any keeper, works like a charm.

== History ==
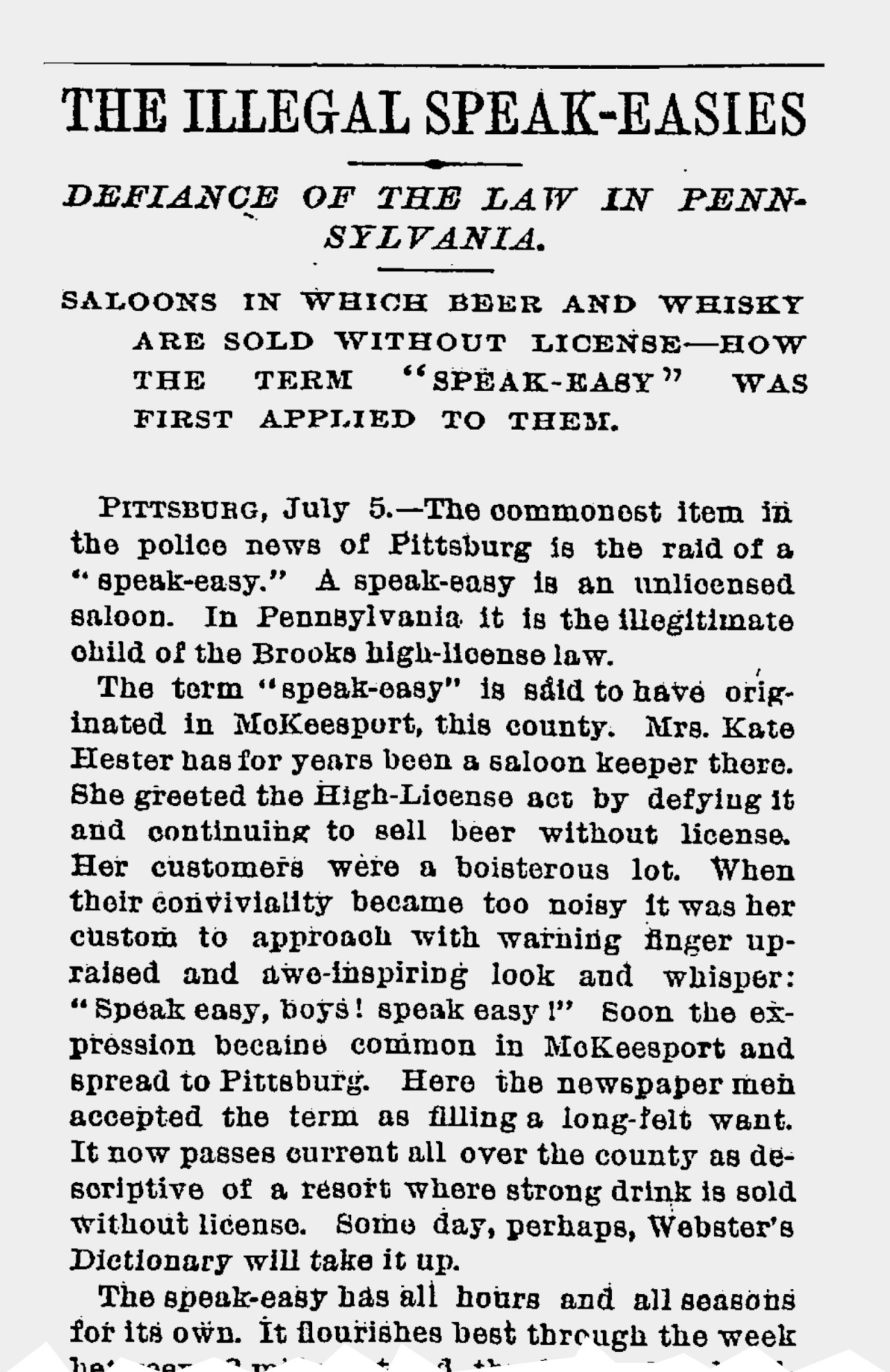
July 6, 1891 article in The New York Times about the origin of the term "speakeasy" in the United States.

The first American speakeasies emerged in the Pittsburgh-area in the late 1880s. To manage the sale of "intoxicating liquors," the Allegheny County Liquor Law was passed in 1872. This law introduced alcohol licenses, set closing times, banned sales to minors, and generally aimed to control the unruly environment. Pittsburgh barkeeps mostly complied with these regulations until 1888, when the Brooks High-License Act increased the annual license fee from $50 to $500. While a few bars paid the fee and others closed, most establishments went underground. By 1890, Pittsburgh had about 700 speakeasies but only 92 licensed liquor dealers. This led to national press attention, including an 1891 New York Times article noting:

The commonest term in the police news of Pittsburg is the raid of a "speak-easy". [...] the expression became common in McKeesport and spread to Pittsburg. Here the newspaper men accepted the term as filling a long-felt want. It now passes current all over the country as a descriptive of a resort where strong drink is sold without license.

Speakeasies were numerous and popular during the Prohibition years (1920–33). Some were operated by people who were part of organized crime. Even though police and agents of the Bureau of Prohibition would often raid them and arrest their owners and patrons, they were so profitable that they continued to flourish. The speakeasy soon became one of the biggest parts of American culture during this time. Several changes happened as speakeasies formed; one was with integration. People of all races, black or white, would gather together and even mingle. People would mix together and have few or no problems.

Another change that occurred was more participation from women. Many businesses would set up their speakeasies to attract women to get more profits. Women also began to insert themselves into the business of speakeasies. Texas Guinan, a former screen and stage actress, opened many speakeasies during Prohibition such as the 300 Club and the El Fey. Guinan greeted customers with "Hey Suckers" and admitted she would be nothing without Prohibition. Her two biggest competitors were Helen Morgan and Belle Livingston.

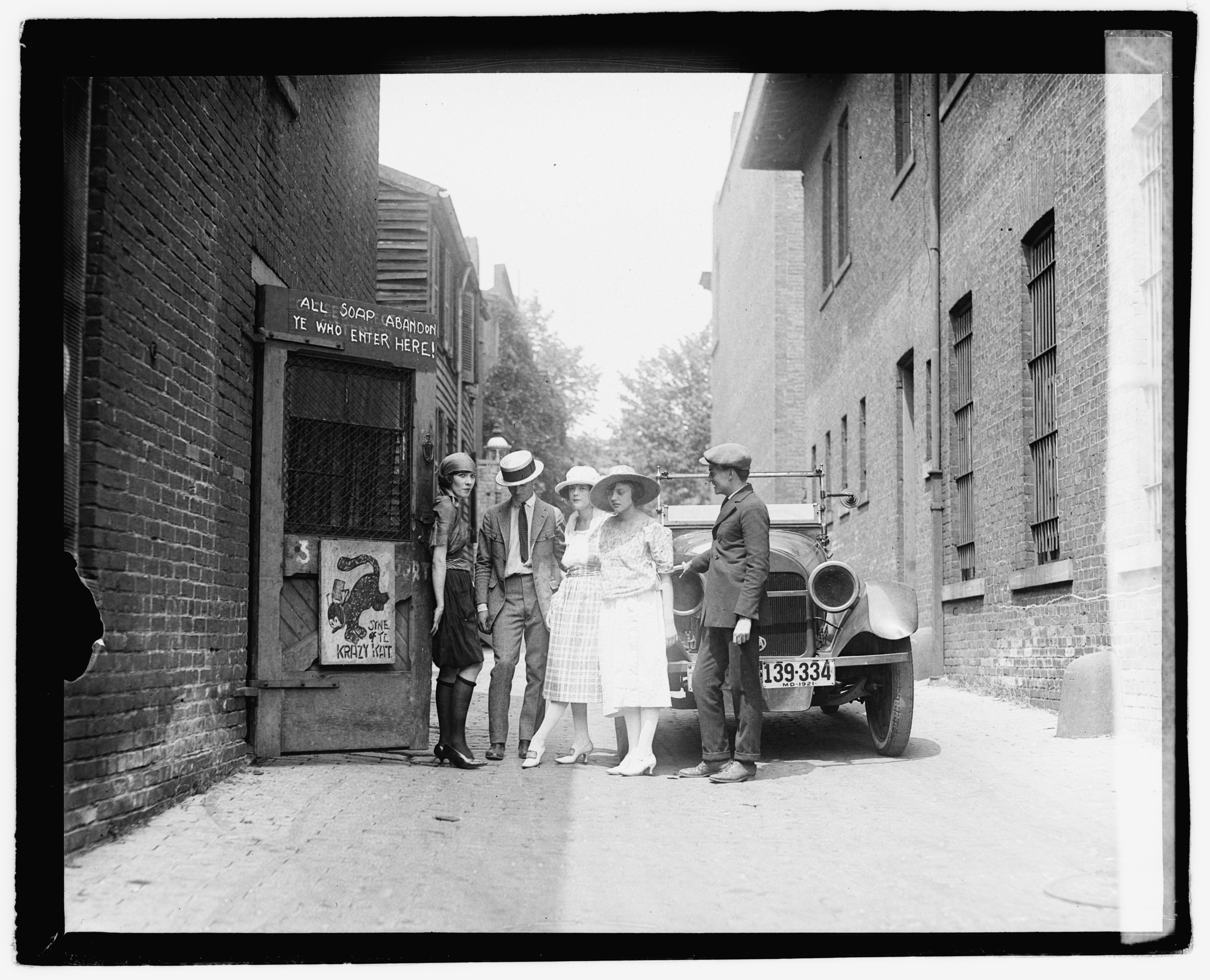
Several patrons and a flapper await the opening of the Krazy Kat Klub, a speakeasy in Washington, D.C., in 1921.

Speakeasies also affected culture during Prohibition, and the speakeasy became a focal point. Films were restricted from depicting alcohol on screen, but some still continued to do so because they felt it showed the way Americans lived, such as the scene in Our Dancing Daughters in which Joan Crawford dances on a table in a speakeasy.

The poor quality bootleg liquor sold in some speakeasies was responsible for a shift away from 19th-century "classic" cocktails, that celebrated the raw taste of the liquor (such as the gin cocktail, made with jenever [sweet gin]), to new cocktails aimed at masking the taste of rough moonshine. These masking drinks were termed "pansies" at the time (although some, such as the Brandy Alexander, would now be termed "classic").

The quality of the alcohol sold in speakeasies ranged from very poor to very good, depending on the owner's source. Cheap liquor was generally used because it was more profitable. In other cases, brand names were used to specify the liquor customers wanted. However, sometimes when brand names were used, some speakeasies cheated; they lied to their customers by giving them poor quality liquor instead of the higher-quality liquor the customer ordered. Prices were four to five dollars a bottle.

Speakeasy-themed cocktail bars made a resurgence in the 2000s. In 2022, amid the COVID-19 pandemic, the theme again became popular, especially in New York City. Speakeasy concepts have spread globally, to name a few of many from PDT & Attaboy in New York City to Mexico city-Handshake Speakeasy, to Buenos Aires, Argentina-Floreria Atlántico, to Paris-Candelaria, to Lisbon, Portugal-Ulysses Lisbon Speakeasy, the growth of Speakeasy style cocktail experiences are popping up globally.

== Varieties ==
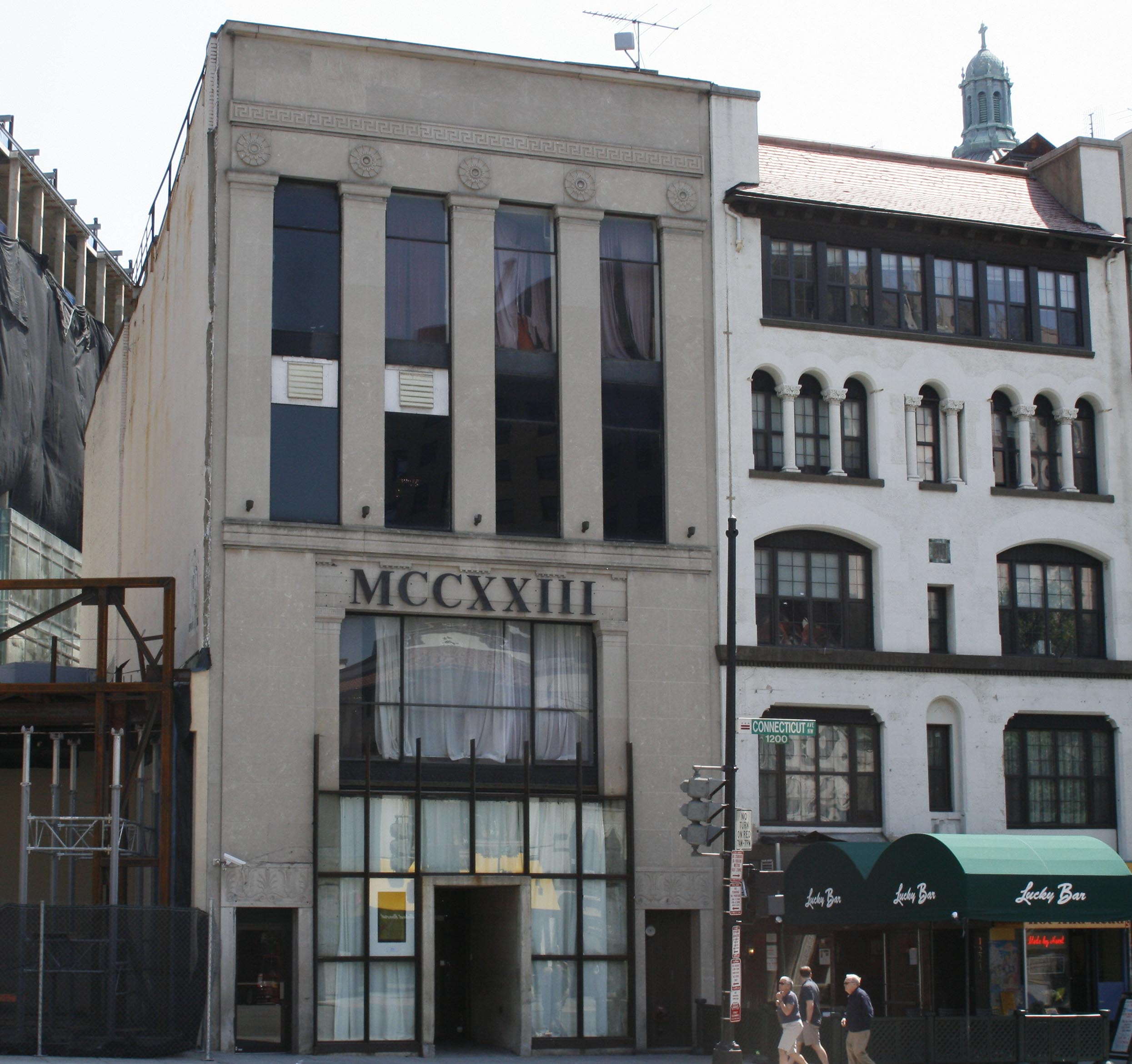
The Mayflower Club, an upmarket speakeasy in Washington, D.C., offered liquor and gambling.

From the beginning the speakeasy was relatively small with little or no entertainment involved, but through gradual growth it popularized and expanded to many different areas with new additions of entertainment and eventually made the speakeasy one of the biggest businesses during Prohibition.

In many rural towns, small speakeasies and blind pigs were operated by local business owners. These family secrets were often kept even after Prohibition ended. In 2007 secret underground rooms thought to have been a speakeasy were found by renovators on the grounds of the Cyber Cafe West in Binghamton, New York.

Speakeasies did not need to be big to operate. "It didn't take much more than a bottle and two chairs to make a speakeasy." One example for a speakeasy location was the "21" Club in New York. This is one of the more famous of the speakeasies and operated until 2020. The "21" Club was only part of a series of businesses owned by Charlie Berns and Jack Kriendler. They started the business in Greenwich with a place called "The Redhead" and later moved onto the next operation "The Puncheon Club". The "21" Club was special because of its system to remain under the radar. It was a unique system that used a doorkeeper to send a warning to the bar that it was in danger and the bar would transform into an ordinary place through a mechanism.

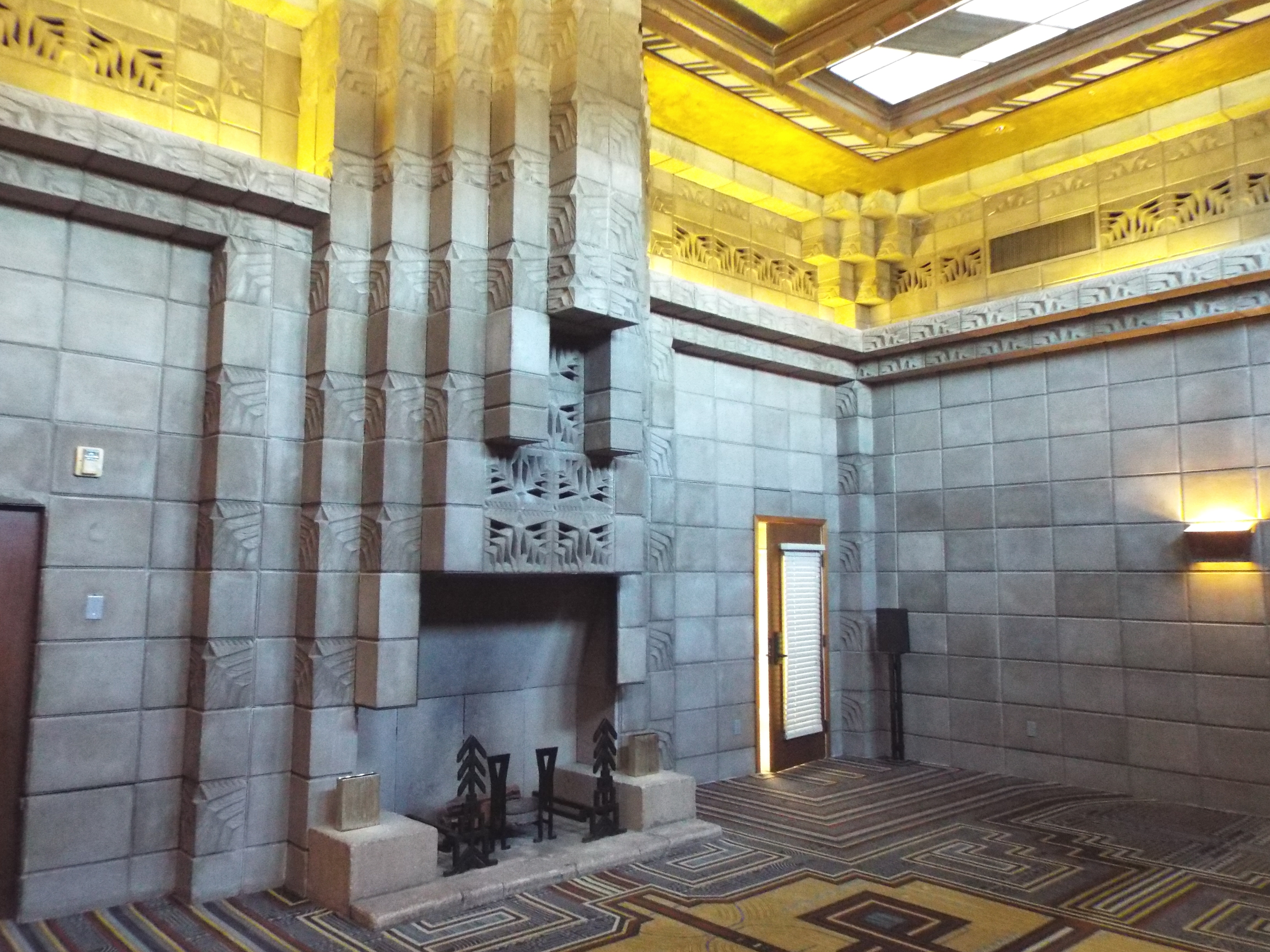
Inside the Mystery Room of the Arizona Biltmore Hotel which served as a speakeasy during Prohibition

The speakeasy spread all over New York with businesses such as the "Bath Club" and "O'Leary's on the Bowery". "The Bath Club" had musicians perform in their place to keep it unique. This idea of musicians spread throughout the speakeasy business and soon enough many of them had musicians.

Beer flats were a residential version of the more upscale speakeasy, and were common in the midwestern United States.

== See also ==
- Smokeasy
- List of bars § Speakeasies
- Index of drinking establishment–related articles
- Black and tan clubs

== Bibliography ==
- Britten, Loretta & Math, Paul, eds. Our American Century Jazz Age: The 20s. New York: Time-Life Books, 1998. New York: Bishop Books Inc., 1969. ISBN 0-7835-5509-1.
- Kahn, Gordon & Hirschfeld, Al. The Speakeasies of 1932. New York: Glenn Young Books, (1932, rev. 2003). ISBN 1-55783-518-7.
- Okrent, Daniel (2010). Last call: the rise and fall of Prohibition (First Scribner hardcover ed.). New York: Scribner. ISBN 978-0-7432-7702-0. OCLC 419812305.
- Streissguth, Thomas. The Dry Years: The Roaring Twenties. Encyclopedia. 2007 ed. Washington, DC: Facts On File, Inc. ISBN 0-8160-6423-7.
