= Ora Kress Mason =

American physician

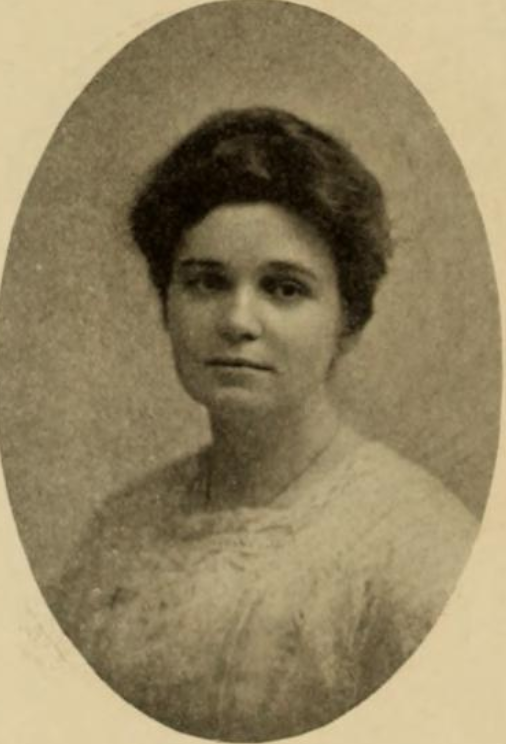
- Ora Kress, from the 1911 yearbook of the Woman's Medical College of Pennsylvania
- Born: Ora Hannah Kress; November 7, 1888; Flint, Michigan, U.S.
- Died: September 20, 1970 (aged 81); Murray, Kentucky, U.S.
- Education: Woman's Medical College of Pennsylvania (1911)
- Occupations: Physician; politician; hospital administrator; nursing educator
- Spouse: William Herbert Mason (m. 1917; died 1941)
- Children: 1
- Parents: Daniel H. Kress (father); Lauretta E. Kress (mother)

Ora Hannah Kress Mason (born Ora Hannah Kress; November 7, 1888 – September 20, 1970) was an American physician, nursing educator, and hospital administrator in Murray, Kentucky, who ran for Congress in 1926.

== Early life and education ==
Ora Hannah Kress was born in Flint, Michigan, and raised in various places, including Australia, France, and England. Her parents Daniel H. Kress and Lauretta E. Kress were both physicians (an internist and an obstetrician, respectively) and Seventh-Day Adventist missionaries. Her older sister Eva died in England in 1899. She completed nurse's training at Sydney Sanitarium in Sydney, while her parents were working there. She earned her medical degree at the Woman's Medical College of Pennsylvania, graduating summa cum laude in 1911.

== Career ==
Mason moved to Murray, Kentucky with her new husband in 1917, and became superintendent of the nursing school there, while maintaining a private medical practice. Both Masons, who were white, treated Black patients in their work, and the couple assisted several promising local Black students to attend college and medical school, including T. R. M. Howard.

Mason, her husband, and her brother-in-law owned and operated the Mason Memorial Hospital in Murray, opened in 1921. The hospital burned down in 1935, but all patients and staff escaped the fire. A new structure resumed the hospital's work in 1937, and survived the death of William Herbert Mason in 1941. Ora Mason was director of nursing and continued to run the hospital's nursing school for a few years, until it stopped admitting new students in 1945. She and other board members sold the hospital in 1947. She retired from medical work in 1957. The nursing education building at Murray State University was named for her in 1967.

Mason was a delegate to the 1924 Republican National Convention, and ran unsuccessfully for an open House seat in 1926, under the name "Mrs. William H. Mason". In 1934 she spoke at a conference on "Citizenship, Government, and the Handicapped Person." She was president of the Murray Woman's Club. She served on the board of regents at Murray State University.

== Personal life and death ==
Ora Kress married fellow physician and Seventh-Day Adventist William Herbert Mason in 1917. They had a daughter together, Patricia. He died in 1941. Ora Mason died in 1970, aged 81 years. In 1988, a memorial stone dedicated to Mason, her husband, and his brother was erected on the grounds of Murray-Calloway County Hospital. In 1994 and 1995, Karen Edwards-Hunter presented a one-woman show about Ora Kress Mason at the University of Louisville.
