= Anti-Cigarette League of America =

Anti-smoking advocacy group

- Founder: Lucy Page Gaston
- Established: 1899
- President: Lucy Page Gaston

The Anti-Cigarette League of America was an anti-smoking advocacy group which had substantial success in the anti-smoking movement in the late 19th and early 20th centuries in the United States in passing anti-smoking legislation. The campaign sought to pass smoking bans in public places as well as ban cigarettes themselves.

== History ==
The group was founded in 1899 by Lucy Page Gaston, a teacher, writer, lecturer and member of the Woman's Christian Temperance Union. Gaston maintained that cigarette smoking was a "dangerous new habit, particularly threatening to the young and thus likely to lead to the use of alcohol and narcotics, so prevalent in the 1890s." Gaston's mission attracted the attention and the patronage of like-minded progressives and members of the WCTU. By 1901 the organization claimed a membership of 300,000, with a paid staff overseeing chapters throughout the United States and Canada.

Physician Daniel H. Kress was vice-president of the Anti-Cigarette League. Between 1890 and 1930, 15 states enacted laws banning the sale, manufacture, possession, or use of cigarettes, and 22 other states considered such legislation.

Even the legislature of the tobacco-producing state of North Carolina considered cigarette prohibition laws in 1897, 1901, 1903, 1905, 1911, 1913, and again in 1917.

Eventually, all the states repealed their cigarette prohibition laws and associated smoking bans in most public places. Kansas was the last to do so, in 1927.
