= Smoking bans in private vehicles =

Laws prohibiting tobacco smoking in private vehicles

Smoking bans in private vehicles are enacted to protect passengers from secondhand smoke and to increase road traffic safety, e.g. by preventing the driver from being distracted by the act of smoking. Smoking bans in private vehicles are less common than bans extended to public transport or vehicles used during work, like trucks or police cars.

== Traffic security ==
The acts of looking for, reaching for, and then lighting cigarettes can considerably distract a driver. A burning cigarette that has fallen into a driver's lap might lead to panic-like reactions. Cigarette stubs thrown out of a window pose a serious fire threat. Some serious traffic accidents in Germany are known to have been caused by lit cigarettes. Some German tribunals have commented on the imprudence of smoking while driving. Despite that, smoking while driving is legal in Germany, even when children are present. German politician Karl Lauterbach, the country's former Federal Minister of Health, supported banning smoking in vehicles when children are present, a measure supported by 87% of German car drivers, according to an opinion poll conducted by the German Cancer Research Center. In 2023, a proposed law was overturned in the German parliament on the grounds of "excessive restrictions of civil liberties". According to estimates of the German Cancer Research Center, around one million minors in Germany were exposed to smoking in cars as of 2022.

== Protection from secondhand smoke ==
More recently, the dangers of secondhand smoke (SHS) have seen more attention, and smoking in a car (whether in motion or not) is banned in some jurisdictions as a measure against passive smoking. SHS, also called environmental tobacco smoke (ETS), is a mixture of two forms of smoke that come from burning tobacco. Mainstream smoke is the smoke exhaled by a smoker. Sidestream smoke is smoke from the lighted end of a cigarette, pipe, or cigar, or tobacco burning in a hookah. This type of smoke has higher concentrations of cancer-causing agents (carcinogens) and is more toxic than mainstream smoke. It also has smaller particles than mainstream smoke. These smaller particles make their way into the lungs and the body’s cells more easily. When non-smokers are exposed to SHS, it is called involuntary smoking or passive smoking. Non-smokers who breathe in SHS take in nicotine and toxic chemicals the same way smokers do. The more SHS someone breathes, the higher the levels of these harmful chemicals in their body. Some laws stipulate that such a ban applies only when a passenger is under a certain age. A study showed that after smoking one cigarette in a car, the time required for respirable particles' concentration to return to its initial value, depending on car movement cases, windows positions and ventilation settings, varies between 10 and 60 minutes.

== Wildfires ==
Cigarettes or cigarette litter thrown out of the window of cars moving through a vegetated area (particularly during the hot season) is one of the causes of wildfires or bushfires. A southern France firefighters' department statistic attributes 16% of local bushfires to cigarette litter thrown out of moving vehicles (and 13.8% to cigarette litter from pedestrians).

== Jurisdictions with a smoking ban in private vehicles ==
=== Australia ===
In the Australian Capital Territory, a smoking ban in cars with minors under the age of 16 has existed since May 2012. An on the spot fine of AUD $150 is applicable for individuals or $750 for companies. Court fines may be higher. The ban includes cigarettes and personal vaporisers/e-cigarettes.

In New South Wales a smoking ban in cars with minors under the age of 16 has existed since July 2009. There is an on the spot fine of AUD $250 for drivers or passengers, with a maximum fine of AUD $1,100 if unsuccessfully disputed or appealed. An amendment added e-cigarettes on 1 December 2015.

In the Northern Territory a smoking ban in cars with minors under the age of 16 has existed since December 2014, the last jurisdiction in Australia to do so.

In Queensland a smoking ban in cars with minors under the age of 16 has existed since January 2010. Smoking-related offences are based on a unit price of $133.45 with offences charged in multiples of the unit price. As of 1 July 2019, smoking in cars with children is two units, or $266.90

In South Australia a smoking ban in cars with minors under the age of 16 has existed since May 2007. The maximum fine is AUD $750 with a AUD $105 expiation fee.

In Tasmania a smoking ban in cars with minors under the age of 18 has existed since 1 January 2008. There is a AUD $110 on the spot fine.

In Victoria a smoking ban in cars with minors under the age of 18 has existed since 1 January 2010.

In Western Australia a smoking ban in cars with minors under the age of 17 has existed since 22 September 2010.

=== Bahrain ===
Since 13 April 2009, smoking in cars with accompanying children is banned in Bahrain.

=== Brazil ===
In Brazil, there is no nationwide federal law prohibiting smoking in private passenger vehicles. However, smoking in public transportation vehicles and taxis is strictly prohibited under the comprehensive Brazilian National Anti-Smoking Law.

=== Canada ===
Smoking with anyone under the age of 16 present in a vehicle is currently banned in the provinces of Alberta, British Columbia, Newfoundland and Labrador, Manitoba, Ontario, New Brunswick, Prince Edward Island, Saskatchewan and Yukon Territory. Smoking is banned in vehicles with persons under the age of 19 present in Nova Scotia.

=== Cyprus ===
On Cyprus smoking in vehicles with minors under the age of 16 is prohibited.

=== France ===
It is forbidden to smoke in private vehicles in the presence of children under the age of 12 since 2015.

=== Greece ===
Greece introduced fines of up to 3,000 Euros for smoking in a vehicle with a minor (a child under 12 years old) in 2019.

=== Mauritius ===
On Mauritius smoking is prohibited in any car carrying passengers, since 2008.

=== New Zealand ===
New Zealand banned smoking in any vehicle carrying a person under 18 years old (unless the person under 18 is the driver) from June 2020, and vaping from November 2021 with fines of NZ$50 applying.

=== South Africa ===
A law prohibiting smoking in private vehicles with minors under the age of 12 has been voted.

=== Turkey ===
In Turkey, smoking in a vehicle has been prohibited since 2013 with the law numbered 4207 in accordance with the smoke-free air policy. People who smoke are subject to fines.

=== United Arab Emirates ===
On 6 January 2010, a federal law (superseding the smoking bans which already existed in most of the emirates) was signed. Among other provisions, it introduces a smoking ban in private vehicles in the presence of children under the age of 12.

=== United Kingdom ===
On 1 October 2015, smoking in vehicles with passengers under 18 was banned in England and Wales, except in convertibles. It is also illegal for drivers under the age of 18 to allow other passengers to smoke in their car, regardless of their age – however drivers under the age of 18 will be permitted to smoke in their car as long as no passengers are present. It is a criminal offence for any driver to fail to stop a passenger illegally smoking in the car while a passenger under the age of 18 is present.

Scotland enacted a ban on 5 December 2016.

While a ban was approved in 2016 in Northern Ireland, it has yet to be enacted.

Smoking is not allowed in work vehicles that more than one person use. Smoking in company cars is allowed, provided that there is only one user of the car and the employer allows.

==== Jersey ====
In Jersey smoking has been banned in all vehicles carrying passengers under the age of 18. Drivers under the age of 18 (the legal driving age in Jersey is 17) are also forbidden to smoke whilst in their own vehicles, even if they are the only passengers. The law came into force on 1 September 2015, after debate in the States Assembly and is the first place in the British Isles to enact a ban of this sort.

=== United States ===
Smoking in cars with children under 18 was banned in the state of California in 2007, and is banned in certain counties and cities of Hawaii, Indiana, Kansas, New Jersey, New York, Kentucky, Alabama and Illinois.

A smoking ban in cars with children is being tested in Arkansas (child's age <14), Louisiana (<13), Maine (<16), Oregon (<18), Puerto Rico (<13), Utah (<15), Vermont (<8), and Virginia (<8).

== Planned smoking bans in private vehicles ==
=== Finland ===
Finland intends to ban smoking in cars while children are present. Furthermore, smoking in places where children are present is to be banned generally.

=== Israel ===
In Israel the introduction of a smoking ban in cars is being discussed in the Knesset.

=== Netherlands ===
Similar plans exist in the Netherlands.

=== Taiwan ===
Taiwan plans to ban smoking while driving a car, riding a bike or walking on a sidewalk. The rationale is the concern about traffic security and air pollution.

== See also ==
- Inflight smoking
- List of smoking bans
