= Smokeasy =

Establishment that permits smoking where prohibited by law

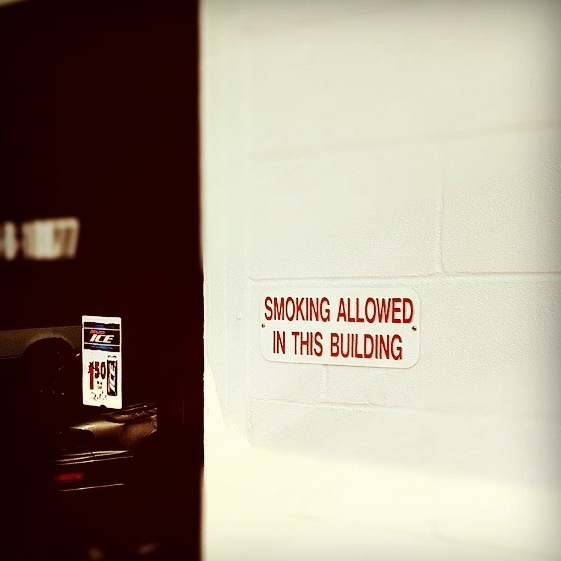
A 2011 sign in Kentucky saying that smoking is allowed in the venue

Smokeasy (also spelled smoke-easy or smokeeasy) is a term which came briefly into use in the wake of government-imposed smoking bans in businesses. It refers to bars and other venues that encourage evasion of the ban. The term has also been used to describe locations and events promoted by tobacco companies to avoid or evade bans on smoking. The word was added to the New Oxford American Dictionary in 2005, although it was used as early as 1978. It is a portmanteau of smoking and speakeasy. As smoking bans have become generally accepted, the term has fallen into disuse.

== Tobacco companies and smokeasies ==
Tobacco companies have used a variety of tactics to encourage the sale and consumption of cigarettes in the presence of smoking bans, and the term smokeasy has commonly been used to describe events and establishments of this kind. Imperial Tobacco hires public venues to promote its Peter Stuyvesant brand. In Chicago, RJ Reynolds established an "upscale smoking lounge" serving alcoholic beverages and food, but classified as a retail tobacco store.

== Examples ==
=== New York City ===
Within one month of the passage of New York City's smoking ban in 2003, smokeasies were quickly predicted. Shortly thereafter, some bartenders began to hear word of smokeasies and theorized that some former regulars who were smokers had switched to the smokeasies. By 2013, acceptance of the law was general, with the Onondaga County Health Department saying that they were receiving and investigating very few complaints.

=== Hawaii ===
In Hawaii, some establishments announced their intention to defy the statewide smoking ban, one of America's strictest, which went into effect on November 16, 2006. However, bans have been successively tightened over time.

=== The Netherlands ===
With the passing of a 2008 smoking ban, many Dutch cafes had become smokeasies despite facing fines up to €18,500. Dutch pub owners voiced their defiance and organized a 1500-5000 owner strong public protest of the ban in November, 2008.

After two years of continued opposition by bar and cafe owners, in the fall of 2010 the Dutch government repealed the ban for smaller bars and cafes which had complained loudly about loss of business. The bans were reinstated and extended in 2018.

== See also ==
- Speakeasy
- Cigar bar
- List of smoking bans in the United States
- Tobacco control
