= Daniel H. Kress =

Canadian physician and missionary (1862–1956)

Daniel Hartman Kress
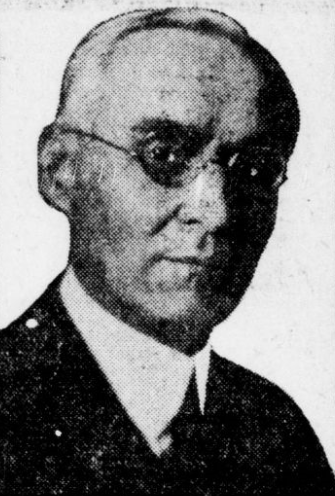
- Kress, c. 1925
- Born: Daniel Hartman Cress; June 27, 1862; St. Jacobs, Province of Canada
- Died: November 2, 1956 (aged 94); Orange County, Florida, U.S.
- Occupation: Physician
- Spouse: Lauretta E. Kress (m. 1884; died 1955)
- Children: 3, including Ora

Daniel Hartman Kress (born Daniel Hartman Cress; June 27, 1862 – November 2, 1956) was a Canadian medical doctor, anti-smoking activist, Seventh-day Adventist missionary and vegetarian. He advocated a vegan diet on religious grounds; after health issues he promoted a lacto-ovo vegetarian diet. He said that meat eating shortens ones lifespan.

== Career ==
Kress was born on June 27, 1862, in St. Jacobs, Ontario. He and his wife obtained their M.D. degrees at the same graduation from the University of Michigan Medical School in 1894. Kress and his wife Lauretta Eby Kress were Seventh-day Adventists who trained at the Battle Creek Sanitarium. He specialized in internal medicine at Battle Creek (1894–1898) and was medical director at Meadvale Sanitarium and Hospital at Surrey Hill, London (1898–1900).

He was physician-in-chief of Sydney Sanitarium in Wahroonga (1900–1907). He was the medical director of Washington Sanitarium and Hospital at Takoma (1907–1910). He specialized in neurology (1915–1939). He was a neurologist at the Florida Sanitarium and Hospital in Orlando, Florida (1939–1948). Kress retired in 1949.

Kress was the editor of Australasian Good Health and the Life and Health magazine. Kress was a member of the American Medical Association. He married Lauretta Eby in 1884, they had several children. Kress died aged 94.

== Anti-smoking activism ==
Kress was vice-president of the Anti-Cigarette League. In 1913, Kress and Lucy Page Gaston founded a smoking-cure clinic at the Anti-Cigarette League's Chicago headquarters in Chicago. Kress patented a mouthwash which contained a weak nitrate solution which he believed would cure all craving for cigarettes.

== Vegetarianism ==
Kress was originally a vegan and believed that butter, eggs, meat and milk should be avoided. He argued that plants contained "all the elements needed for the human body". Kress visited New Zealand in 1901. He worked at the Christchurch Medical and Surgical Sanitarium. He lectured at the Christchurch Art Gallery on food reform, condemning alcohol and meat consumption. Kress was a teetotaller who believed that animal flesh "created a craving for alcoholic drink". He argued that meat-eating shortens ones lifespan.

Kress suffered from pernicious anemia and was expected to die in 1901. His wife arranged for him to be buried at Avondale College cemetery. However, he received a letter from Ellen G. White which advised he be given fresh-beaten eggs in grape juice, as "this will supply that which is necessary for your system". The letter also stated that eggs and milk should be included in the diet as these "cannot at present be dispensed with, and the doctrine of dispensing with them should not be taught". He followed the counsel given and slowly recovered. His health had deteriorated from an unbalanced vegan diet. He became a vegetarian, adding dairy and eggs to his diet. He fully recovered and lived another 55 years. Kress made other trips to New Zealand. In 1905, he lectured in Gisborne on dieting and longevity. He promoted a Biblical diet of fruit, grains, nuts and seeds as the original diet of mankind. Kress condemned tobacco smoking as a cause of cancer and a "crime to the community, as it poisons the air".

Kress opposed the consumption of mustard, peppers, pickles and spices as they created a thirst for alcohol and were "not designed to be fed into the human body". In 1909, Kress and his wife authored the Good Health Cookery Book which contains meatless recipes based around cereals, fruits and vegetables. The Kresses advised two meals a day and suggested nutmeat or protose (a mixture of nuts and gluten) as substitutes for meat.

== Selected publications ==
- Diet and Morals (1899)
- Cancer: Its Cause and Rational Treatment (Life and Health: The National Health Magazine, 1909)
- Good Health Cookery Book (1909, with Lauretta Eby Kress)
- May We Abandon Meat (Good Health, 1912)
- A Narcotized World (1917)
- Cancer, the Modern: Plague of Civilized Lands (The Medical Evangelist, 1922)
- The Cigarette as a Physician Sees It (1931)
- The Modern Use of Tobacco (1940)
- Under the Guiding Hand: Life Experiences of the Doctors Kress (1941, with Lauretta Eby Kress)

== See also ==
- Harry Willis Miller
