= A Counterblaste to Tobacco =

1604 anti-tobacco treatise by King James VI of Scotland

A Counter-Blaste to Tobacco
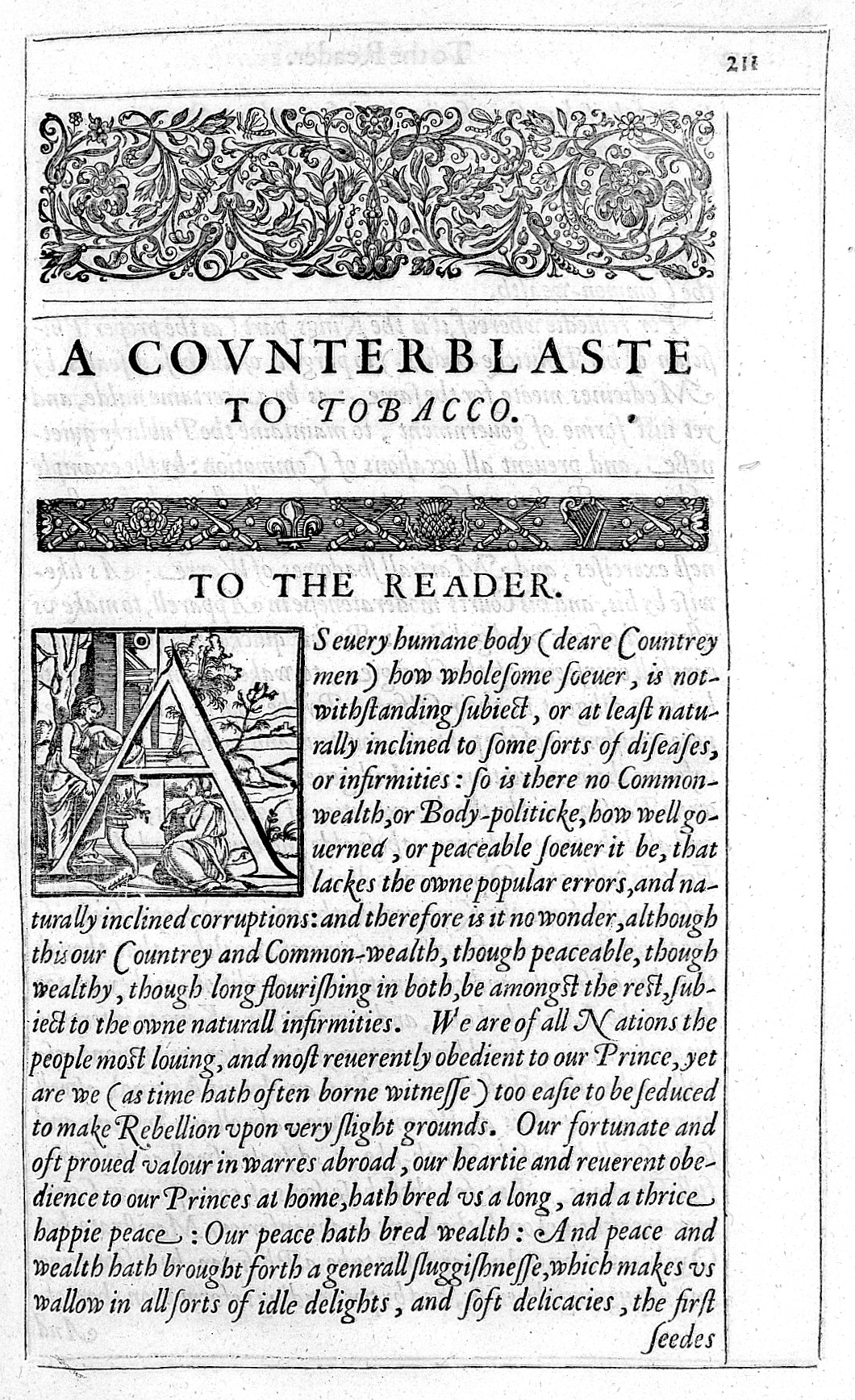
- Title page
- Author: James VI and I
- Language: Early Modern English
- Subject: Anti-tobacco
- Publication date: 1604
- Text: A Counter-Blaste to Tobacco at Wikisource

A Counterblaste to Tobacco is a treatise written by King James VI and I in 1604. In it he expresses his distaste for tobacco and tobacco-smoking. It is one of the earliest known anti-smoking publications.

== Style and content ==
It is written in Early Modern English and refers to medical theories of the time (e.g. the four humours). In it James blames the Native Americans for bringing tobacco to Europe, complains about passive smoking, warns of dangers to the lungs and decries tobacco's odour as "hatefull to the Nose."

== Effects and legacy ==
James's dislike of tobacco led him in 1604 to authorise Thomas Sackville, 1st Earl of Dorset, to levy an excise tax and tariff of six shillings and eight pence per pound of tobacco imported, or £1 per three pounds, a large sum of money for the time. This would be £90 per pound in 2024, or £198 per kilogram.

Because of the persistently high demand for tobacco in the Kingdom of England and the negative effects on the economies of its colonies in British America, the King in 1624 instead created a royal monopoly on tobacco. 150 years later the British utilitarian philosopher Jeremy Bentham would cite A Counterblaste to Tobacco as an example of antipathy run wild.

== Quotation ==
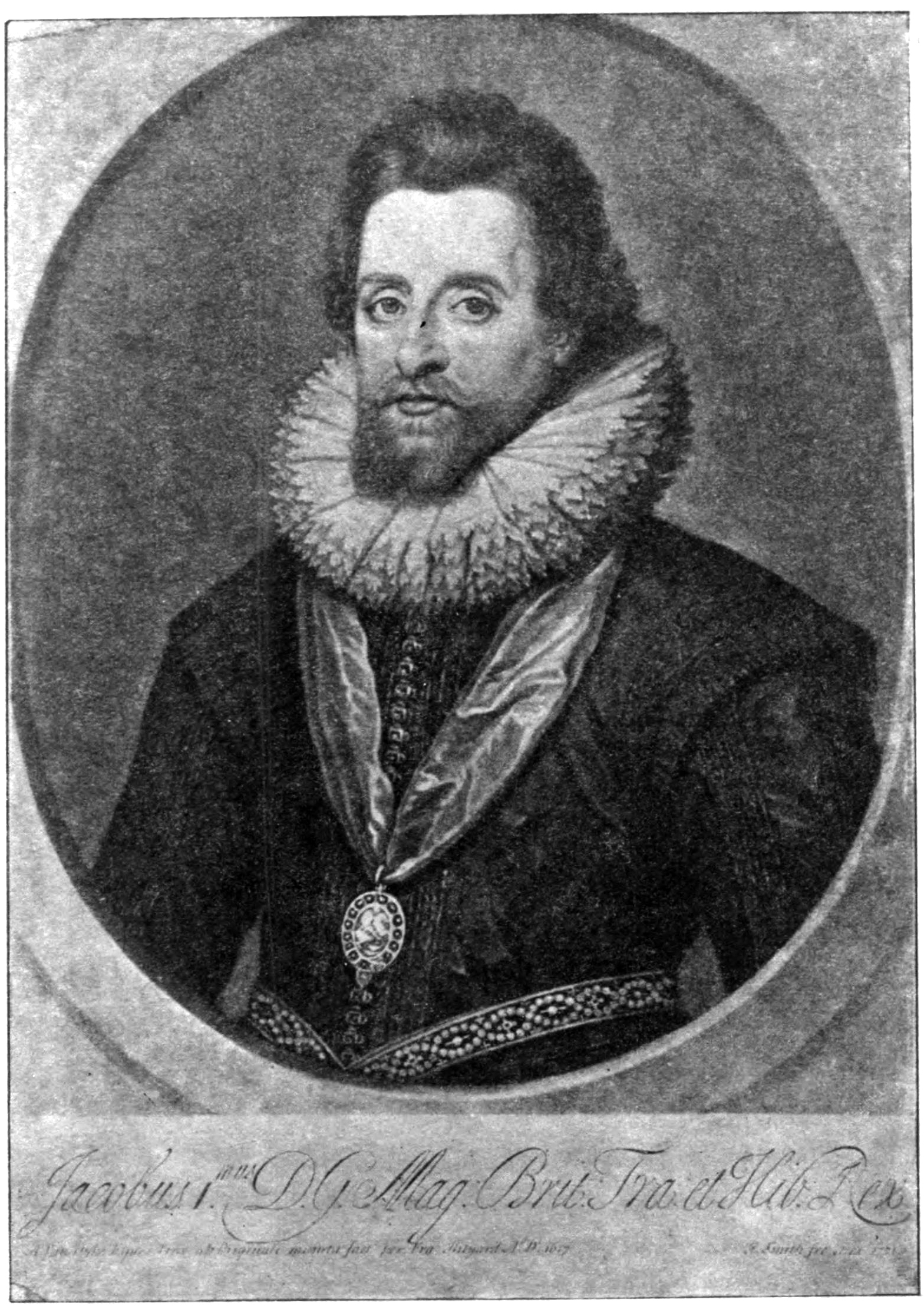
James VI and I

Have you not reason then to bee ashamed, and to forbeare this filthie noveltie, so basely grounded, so foolishly received and so grossely mistaken in the right use thereof? In your abuse thereof sinning against God, harming your selves both in persons and goods, and raking also thereby the markes and notes of vanitie upon you: by the custome thereof making your selves to be wondered at by all forraine civil Nations, and by all strangers that come among you, to be scorned and contemned. A custome lothsome to the eye, hatefull to the Nose, harmefull to the braine, dangerous to the Lungs, and in the blacke stinking fume thereof, neerest resembling the horrible Stigian smoke of the pit that is bottomelesse.

— James 1604
