= Lauretta Eby Kress =

American physician (1863–1955)

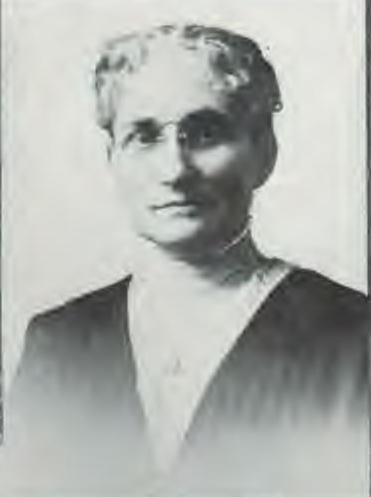
- Born: Lauretta Eby; February 10, 1863; Flint, Michigan, U.S.
- Died: June 28, 1955; Takoma Park, Maryland, U.S.
- Resting place: Woodlawn Memorial Park, Florida, U.S.
- Education: University of Michigan Medical School
- Occupation: Obstetrician
- Spouse: Daniel H. Kress (m. 1884)
- Children: 3, including Ora Kress Mason

Lauretta Eby Kress (born Lauretta Eby; February 10, 1863 – June 28, 1955) was an American obstetrician, hospital founder, and medical missionary. She was the first licensed female physician in Montgomery County, Maryland, and co-founded the Sydney Sanitarium while serving as a Seventh-day Adventist missionary in Australia. A graduate of the University of Michigan Medical School, Kress spent decades practicing medicine in the Washington, D.C., area, where she delivered more than 5,000 babies and directed the Women's Clinic. She was an early advocate for women's health, vegetarianism, temperance, and anti-smoking reform, co-authoring a vegetarian cookbook with her husband and holding leadership roles in professional medical associations.

== Biography ==
=== Early and personal life ===
Lauretta Eby was born in Flint, Michigan on February 10, 1863 to Aaron and Hannah Amelia Burkhart Eby. Her mother was a teacher and her father, a Canadian immigrant, was an affluent blacksmith and carriage builder. She grew up in Buchanan, Michigan. Kress graduated from high school in Flint at the age of 16, then taught at a school in Michigan. After working as a teacher in Buchanan, for several years, she moved to Detroit, where she worked as a bookkeeper and billing clerk for a pharmaceutical company.

During a visit to Canada she met Daniel H. Cress, with whom she began a long-distance courtship. They married in Genesee, Michigan, on July 9, 1884. His surname was originally Cress, but she later convinced him to change it to Kress. They had three children, Eva Lauretta (born 1885), Ora Hannah (born 1887, who also became a physician and later ran for Congress), and John Eby (born 1903). Kress and her husband were practicing Baptists, and he later became a pastor. However, he left the ministry due to disagreements over Sabbath observance. The couple eventually became Seventh-day Adventists. Kress painted china as a hobby. The family lived at 705 Carroll Avenue, Takoma Park, Maryland, that is now a historic home.

=== Medical career ===
After meeting John Harvey Kellogg at a conference, Kress and her husband moved to Battle Creek, Michigan, where they worked at the Battle Creek Sanitarium. Kellogg convinced them both to study medicine, both at the Sanitarium and later at the University of Michigan Medical School. They both graduated in 1894—Kress with a focus on obstetrics and gynecology, and her husband specializing in gastrointestinal disorders.

From the 1890s to the early 1900s, the couple worked as medical missionaries in London and Australia, at the personal urging of Seventh-day Adventist cofounder Ellen G. White. While in Australia, Kress founded the Sydney Sanitarium.

After nearly eight years in Australia, they returned to the United States in 1907 to help establish the Washington Sanitarium in Takoma Park, Maryland—recently chosen as the headquarters of the Seventh-day Adventist Church. Her husband was named medical director, while Kress joined the medical staff and became the first licensed female physician to practice in Montgomery County, Maryland. In addition to her obstetric work, she managed staff operations and oversaw nurse training during her husband's frequent absences for public speaking.

In 1916, she opened the Kress Maternity and Children's Hospital at the Washington Sanitarium, which later became Washington Adventist Hospital, delivering more than 5,000 babies in 30 years there. In 1930, she became the Director of the Women's Clinic in Washington, D.C. Kress was also a member of the Women’s Medical Association, serving as president of its D.C. chapter from 1927 to 1929 and as national chair of legislation from 1934 to 1935.

=== Health advocacy ===
In 1909, Kress and her husband published the Good Health Cookery Book, in which they advised readers to eat only two meals a day, both vegetarian, one early in the morning and the other in the mid-afternoon. Kress was an early opponent of smoking, believing it posed serious risks to health. She persuaded her husband to avoid smoking and drinking, and together they became lifelong advocates of abstaining from alcohol, tobacco, and meat.

=== Later life and death ===
In 1939, Kress, her husband, and their son John relocated to Orlando, Florida, where they became members of the Winter Park church. They remained active in church life as well as in travel, writing, and public speaking. However, the physician shortage during the Second World War prompted both Kress and her husband to resume full-time medical work for two years at the Florida Sanitarium and Hospital. Kress temporarily returned from retirement once more in 1948 to assist in the delivery of her 4,388th infant.

The couple marked their 70th wedding anniversary in July 1954 while Kress was hospitalized following a stroke. She later returned home, where she died on June 28, 1955, at the age of 92. The funeral service for Lauretta Kress was held at the Kress Memorial Church in Winter Park, Florida, which was named in honor of the Kress family. She was buried at Woodlawn Memorial Park, Florida.

== Publications ==
- Good Health Cookery Book (with Daniel H. Kress; 1909)
- Under the Guiding Hand: Life Experiences of the Doctors Kress (with Daniel H. Kress; 1941)
