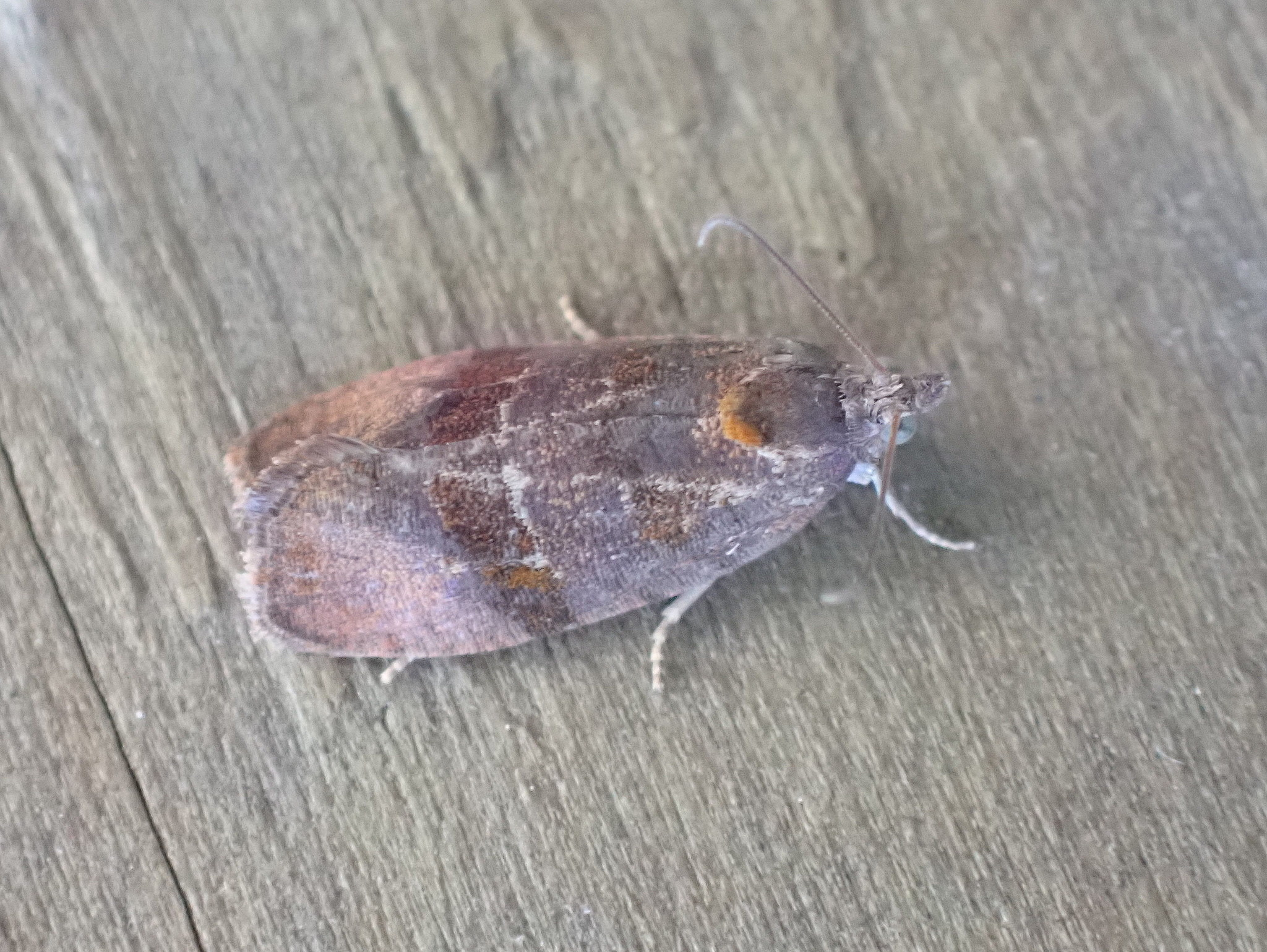

Scientific classification
- Kingdom: Animalia
- Phylum: Arthropoda
- Class: Insecta
- Order: Lepidoptera
- Family: Tortricidae
- Subfamily: Olethreutinae
- Genus: Evora; Heinrich, 1926
- Species: E. hemidesma

Binomial name
- Evora hemidesma (Zeller, 1875)

= Evora hemidesma =

Genus of tortrix moths

Evora hemidesma is a species of moth in the family Tortricidae. It is the only species in the monotypic genus Evora.
