= Smoking in Costa Rica =

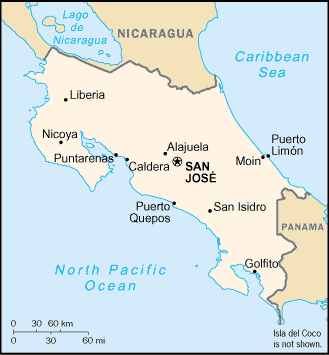
Map of Costa Rica

According to the Global Adult Tobacco Survey (GATS) conducted in 2015, 8.9% of Costa Ricans smoked tobacco. The percentage of people exposed to secondhand smoke indoors at the workplace was 6.3%, while 4.9% were exposed in their own home.

== History ==
For around the last 40 years, Costa Rica did not have many smoking laws in place due to the influence of the big tobacco companies on their population and government. The laws that were in place were inconsistent and not very well enforced. Beginning in the 1970s and lasting through the 1990s, the country attempted to ban smoking. The first attempt to reduce tobacco use was in 1979 when a piece of legislation was proposed to ban all tobacco advertisement. They created many pieces of legislation including the 1982 Costa Rican Institute of Public Health, the 1986 Institute of Alcoholism and Drug Dependence, and the 1995 Campaign for Tobacco Free Kids, all of which shared a common goal of working to keep the people of Costa Rica healthy, which included the deterrence of cigarette smoking and lowering the risk of second hand smoke risks. Much of the work that these organizations did to reduce smoking was not successful among the population because of big tobacco companies having a greater political presence such as Philip Morris International and British American Tobacco. For instance, the bill in 1992 which would have made workplaces completely smoke free and stop tobacco companies from advertising cigarettes, was weakened by these companies and led to the law in 1995 which allowed designated areas for smoking at workplaces and other public places and had weak restrictions when it came to the advertisement of tobacco products. Again in 2001 and 2002, the Pan American Health Organization worked with various groups to attempt to implement smoke free workplace legislation. Even though the program itself was not very successful, it was partially responsible for Bill 14.884 in the summer of 2002 which was successful in prohibiting smoking in the workplace. This bill also required more warning labels and prohibited advertising of tobacco products. The country also implemented programs such as the Courtesy of Choice which strengthened the tobacco industry. These pieces of legislation caused Costa Rica to be the main country for successful cooperation between the government and the tobacco industry, which ultimately allowed the tobacco industry to have success in marketing and selling their products throughout the late 1980s into the early 2000s.

After the law was passed in 2012, smoking was banned in most public places.

Eventually, things began to turn around and new legislation for anti-smoking laws were put in place. In 2007, the National Anti-Tobacco Network (RENATA) worked with the government to ratify and implement the Framework Convention on Tobacco Control (FCTC). Then, in March 2012, Costa Rica passed one of the strictest smoking regulations in the world by a 45-2 vote in favor. This legislation has banned smoking in buses, taxis, trains and their terminals, work places, public buildings, restaurants, bars, casinos, and all enclosed public-access buildings, granting no exceptions (no separate “smoking areas” are permitted). It also banned smoking in outdoor recreational or educational areas such as parks, stadiums and university campuses. The bill requires cigarette packs to display text and photo warnings on at least 50 percent of packaging.

It introduced a tax of twenty colones per cigarette and prohibits any form of tobacco advertising, the use of misleading terms such as “light” or “milds” and the sale of small packages or individual cigarettes (setting a minimum of 20 cigarettes per package). Violators will be fined a minimum of 180,000 colones (US$355). Compliance with the law has been surprisingly high and smoking has disappeared in banned areas. Several programs and promotional campaigns have been started by the government and private institutions to promote quitting smoking, with very positive results.

== Smoking among physicians ==
Another factor that contributed to smoking in this country was the lack of physicians as positive role models. During the early 1990s, almost 20% of physicians were current smokers and about 40% were former smokers. These numbers account for over half of physicians in all of Costa Rica who smoked cigarettes at some point in their life. Additionally, two thirds of physicians who did smoke did it at the workplace, which set a poor example for the patients. This being said, many people saw their doctors using tobacco products and in turn, made it seem more acceptable to use these products since medical professionals were doing so.

== Advertising ==
Another important change that many people have noticed is the increasing anti-tobacco advertisement, including television and radio commercials. According to the GATS in 2015, seven in ten people noticed these advertisements.
