= Edward Page Gaston =

American journalist

Edward Page Gaston (November 19, 1868 – 1956), FRGS, was an American journalist, lecturer, and temperance activist from Harvey, Illinois. He was also a proponent for the repatriation of the remains of Pocahontas.

== Early life ==
Gaston was born in Henry, Illinois, in 1868. He was the son of Alexander H. Gaston and Henrietta (née Page) Gaston; he was the brother of anti-tobacco crusader Lucy Page Gaston.

== Career ==
While serving as the European manager for Funk & Wagnalls, he lived in London. He was attached for a time to the American Legation in Mexico City and founded the PanAmerican news agency in the same city; Gaston also climbed the Popocatépetl volcano in Mexico. Gaston excavated and surveyed prehistoric ruins and cliff-dwellings in Arizona and New Mexico with the Hemenway Southwestern Archaeological Expedition (1888), living among Zuni (1893).

Gaston was involved with social issues. He was founder and the U.S. director of the World Prohibition Federation; founder and honorary secretary of the International Prohibition Confederation, London, 1909; as well as a spokesman for approximately 100 temperance societies, including the Woman's Christian Temperance Union and the Anti-Saloon League. He also formed and led an organization known as the New Vigilantes whose purpose was to "challenge the power of the gangsters of New York and throughout the country ... and to place hundreds of them, as well as corrupt public and police officials, behind the bars." In 1923, in search of the remains of Pocahontas, Gaston received permission from St George's Church to dig on the site of the burned down Gravesend church.

Gaston received the Turkish decoration of the Lya'kat (Order of Merit). He was a fellow of the Royal Geographical Society; as well as the founder and honorary secretary of the International Prohibition Confederation, London, 1909.

== Personal life ==
He married Lilian Craske in 1901.
