= Lucy Page Gaston =

American anti-smoking advocate (1860–1924)

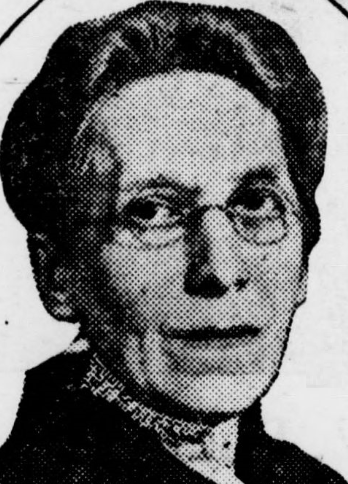
- Born: 1860; Delaware, Ohio
- Died: 1924 (aged 63–64); Hinsdale, Illinois
- Occupation: Anti-tobacco activist

Lucy Page Gaston (May 19, 1860 – August 20, 1924) was an anti-tobacco activist of the late 19th and early 20th century. She was the founder of the Anti-Cigarette League of America, which had as its goal the abolition of cigarettes.

== Early life ==
Lucy Gaston was born Lucy Jane Gaston on May 19, 1860 in Delaware, Ohio to a family involved in abolition and temperance movements. Census records show that in 1870 the family was living in Henry, Illinois. In 1873, they transferred their church membership to the Lacon First Presbyterian Church, Lacon, Illinois. In 1876 she received a certificate to teach school, one year before graduating from high school in Lacon. She attended Illinois State Normal School (now Illinois State University) in 1881 and 1882, where it is reported that she participated in smashing saloons with clubs and axes, ten years before Carrie Nation's first such actions.

In 1890, Lucy changed her middle name from Jane to Page, to be the same as her mother's maiden name. She was working for the Woman's Christian Temperance Union (WCTU) in LaSalle, Illinois.

When visiting relatives, she would come with her car packed full of personal possessions she referred to as her "treasures."

By 1893 she and her family, including her parents and fellow activist brother, Edward Page Gaston, were living in Harvey, Illinois, a Chicago suburb that prohibited the sale of alcohol through property deed restrictions. In 1895, Harvey officials issued a license for a tavern, and Lucy, then managing editor of the Harvey Citizen, led a protest by temperance advocates.

Though unsuccessful in stopping the licensing of taverns in Harvey, the effort caught the attention of WCTU president Frances Willard, who recommended Gaston for the position of the national superintendent of the WCTU's Department of Christian Citizenship. This led to much greater activity within the WCTU, including editing of publications and appearing before the Illinois General Assembly on behalf of the organization.

== Anti-Cigarette League ==
The WCTU viewed tobacco as a vice often associated with alcohol, though not necessarily with the same destructive capacity. Lucy Gaston viewed cigarettes as inherently evil. "I am no defender of tobacco in any form," she said, "but the cigarette is in a class by itself."

She founded the Chicago Anti-Cigarette League in 1899, the first group of its kind in the United States. The group quickly went nationwide and beyond, establishing chapters around the United States and Canada, and renaming itself the Anti-Cigarette League of America, which claimed as many as 300,000 members.

The Anti-Cigarette league had considerable success in the early years of the 20th century, and was instrumental in having cigarette bans passed in 12 states between 1899 and 1909.

Gaston's method included publication of anti-cigarette materials, lobbying legislatures as well as personally appealing to people to stay away from cigarettes. She sponsored dances, sports leagues, and writing contests to promote the message. Her anti-smoking magazine The Boy often contained anecdotes of destructive behavior due to cigarette smoking.

Gaston published magazines for children containing advice on avoiding smoking, and personally haunted less reputable neighborhoods of Chicago, calling down boys for smoking and inducing them to sign the "Clean Life Pledge." Gaston also pressured merchants not to hire persons who smoked and admonished the Chicago Cubs baseball team over their use of tobacco. She promoted chewing the root of the gentian plant to reduce the craving for tobacco, and would regularly offer it to smokers trying to quit the habit.

Gaston received support from a number of prominent organizations and persons. The Salvation Army and YMCA prominently opposed smoking. Montgomery Wards of Chicago and Wanamaker's Department Stores of Philadelphia refused to hire smokers, as did several railroads. Prominent men who supported the league included Andrew Carnegie, Thomas Edison, Henry Ford, Stanford President David Starr Jordan, Commissioner of the Food and Drug Administration Harvey Washington Wiley, and heavyweight boxing champion John L. Sullivan. Many of these (particularly Edison, Ford, and Sullivan) were not completely opposed to tobacco, just to the relatively new and foreign vice of cigarettes, as opposed to the more traditional cigar or chewing tobacco. Many of the league's loudest cheerleaders were cigar makers, who saw the profit in frightening cigarette smokers away from their new habit and back to their traditional smokes. Other unexpected backers of the League included North Carolina tobacco farmers, who resented the tactics of cigarette monopoly American Tobacco Company.

Gaston's efforts to secure a smoking ban in her home state seemed to have reached a successful result in 1907, when the Illinois legislature passed a law prohibiting the manufacture and sale of cigarettes. The law was challenged by a Chicago tobacconist, and was overturned by a judge on a seeming technicality, noting that the title of the law was to "regulate" the sale of cigarettes when, in fact, it was a prohibition. The decision was upheld by the state Supreme Court, who also noted ambiguities in the law such that it could not be clear whether or not it prohibited pure tobacco cigarettes.

When World War I started, cigarettes were considered a vital war material. Even the YMCA relented, participating in collecting and distributing cigarettes for soldiers. Gaston continued her opposition, even to the point of filing lawsuits to prevent the transhipment of cigarettes through Kansas, where they were illegal. The suits did not stop the shipments, but they resulted in loss of public esteem for Gaston, who was branded as unpatriotic.

== Post-war ==
After the war, with alcohol prohibition in place, some felt (e.g. evangelist Billy Sunday) that tobacco prohibition would soon follow. This was not to be, as many men came back from the war with a cigarette smoking habit. Many women had also picked up the habit in wartime, reflected in an increase in cigarette consumption from 134 per person per year before the war to 330 after. Gaston felt that the organization she had created had lost its zeal, and began to openly criticize it, leading to her firing in 1920.

In 1920, Gaston declared herself to be a candidate for President of the United States, on the platform of "clean morals, clean food and fearless law enforcement." She self-deprecatingly pointed out her physical resemblance to Abe Lincoln, and contended that Republican candidate (and unabashed cigarette smoker) Warren G. Harding had "cigarette face", a malady that was not well defined but readily apparent to Gaston. She only filed in the Republican primary of South Dakota and dropped out long before the election, eventually attending the convention of the Prohibition Party and supporting William Jennings Bryan.

After her separation from the payroll of the Anti-Cigarette League, she joined the Anti-Cigarette League of Kansas, but was fired after only two months, again for her unwillingness to compromise. After returning to Chicago, she formed a new organization, the National Anti-Cigarette League, but was fired again after six months for employing methods too extreme for the management of the organization. Afterwards, Gaston's personal financial situation became very strained, but she continued to verbally assault smokers and hand out press releases and gentian root. On the way home from an anti-cigarette rally in early 1924, she was struck by a streetcar. During treatment it was discovered that she had throat cancer, to which she succumbed on August 20. Numerous newspapers and even the trade publication The Tobacco Leaf noted her death in articles that were complimentary of her character.

It was suggested that in her later years, Page was impoverished and lived on a diet of only graham crackers and milk.

Recent immigrant and new found supporter, G. Henri de Ronchi, was named Director of the National Anti-Cigarette League. Press releases went out asking for contributions to the "Lucy Page Gaston Memorial Fund" to build "a monument in furthering her great principle of 'To Safeguard the health and morals of the youth, to bring about a higher calibre of individuals.'"
