= List of women cookbook writers =

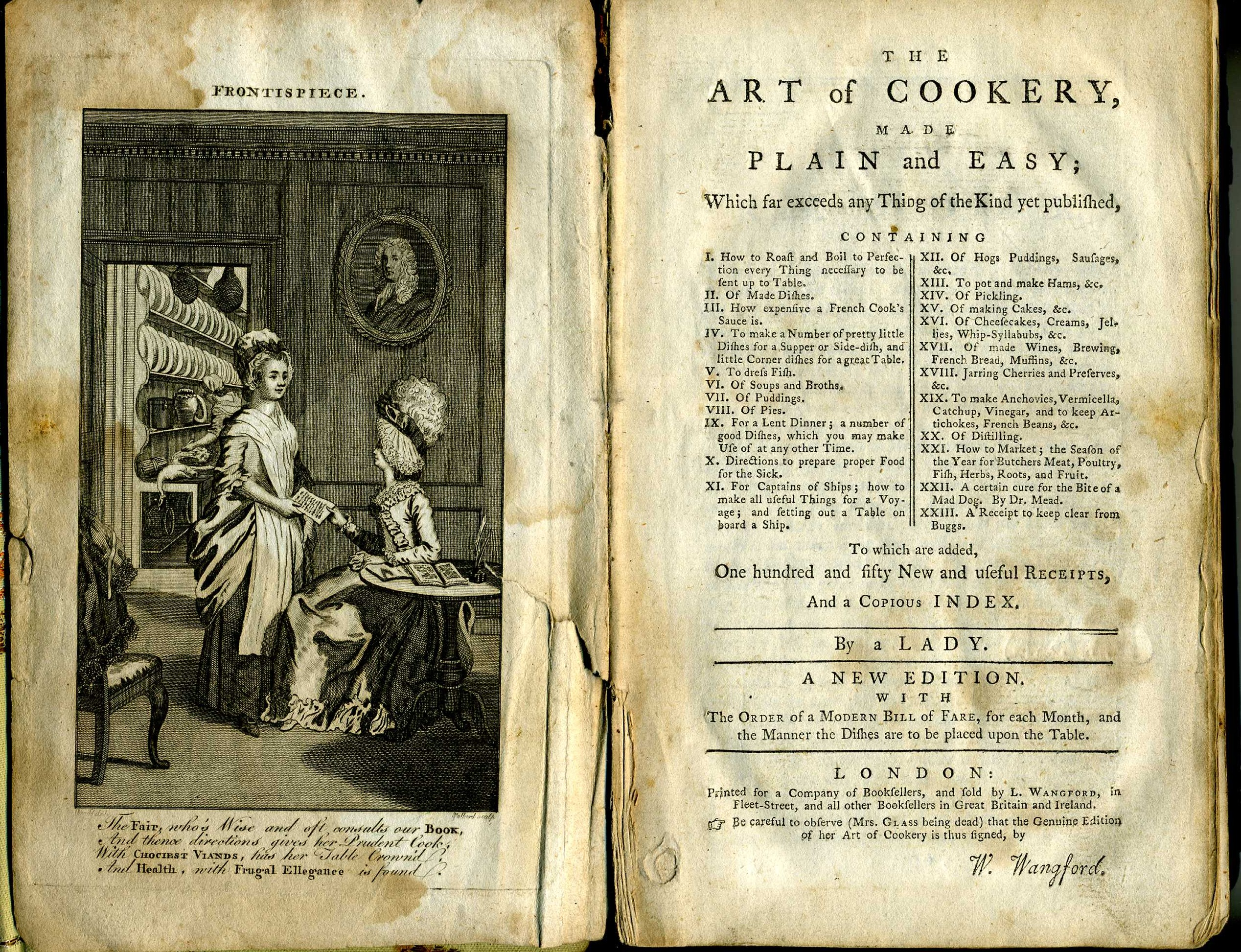
Frontispiece of Hannah Glasse's Art of Cookery, first published 1747

This is a list of notable women cookbook writers.

== Argentina ==
- Choly Berreteaga (1927–2018) chef and television presenter, wrote over 30 cookbooks including Easy Cooking for the Modern Woman in 1976
- Gaby Melian (born 1969/1970), chef, cookbook writer
- Doña Petrona (1896–1992), cookbook writer, home economist, television chef, businesswoman

== Australia ==
- Stephanie Alexander (born 1940), restaurateur, cookbook writer
- Durkhanai Ayubi (born 1985)
- Maggie Beer (born 1945), chef, television personality and food manufacturer
- Rachael Bermingham, authored several books in the 4 ingredients franchise
- Amy Chaplin (born 1974/1975), vegetarian and vegan chef
- Lorna Jane Clarkson (born 1964), activewear businesswoman, writes on health food
- Emiko Davies, writes on Italian food
- Geraldine Dillon (1936–2020), television and radio presenter; newspaper columnist
- Margaret Fulton (1924–2019), British-born journalist, cookbook writer
- Donna Hay (born 1971), popular cookbook writer, magazine editor
- Kylie Kwong (born 1969), television chef and restauranteur, specialising in Chinese cooking
- Kate Lamont (born 1962), businessperson
- Nagi Maehashi (born 1977 or 1978), runs the blog RecipeTin Eats
- Tess Mallos (1933–2012), food journalist, cookbook writer, specializing in Greek and Middle Eastern cuisine
- Karen Martini (born 1971), chef and former-cooking presenter on Better Homes and Gardens
- Kim McCosker, cookbook writer since 2007. Known for the 4 Ingredients brand.
- Hetty Lui McKinnon, vegetarian/plant-based/vegan recipe writer
- Indira Naidoo (born 1968), journalist and presenter of South African Indian
- Mietta O'Donnell (1950–2001), chef, restaurateur, food critic, cookbook writer
- Jess Pryles, barbecue cook and television host based in the United States
- Leanne Ratcliffe (born 1980), YouTuber who promotes a frugivore diet
- Wilhelmina Rawson (1851–1933), Australia's first female cookbook writer, publishing Mrs. Lance Rawson's cookery book and household hints in 1876
- Amy Schauer (1871–1956), cookery instructor
- Charmaine Solomon (born 1930), Australian cook, author of 31 cookbooks and the creator of her own brand of spice blends and marinades
- Sarah Todd (born 1987), celebrity chef, restauranteur and television personality who began as a MasterChef Australia contestant
- Margaret Wylie (1869/1870–1955), home economics instructor who compiled the Golden Wattle Cookery Book (1924)

== Austria ==
- Katharina Prato (1818–1897), cookbook writer, published the highly popular Die süddeutsche Küche in 1858
- Lisl Wagner-Bacher (born 1953), chef and restauranteur, writes on Austrian cuisine

== Bahrain ==
- Afnan Al Zayani, television presenter and businesswoman, published her first cookbook in 1983

== Bangladesh ==
- Keka Ferdousi (born 1960), television chef
- Alpana Habib (born 1966), UK-born chef
- Siddika Kabir (1931–2012), nutritionist, educator, cookbook writer, television host

== Belgium ==
- Regula Ysewijn (born 1983)

== Brazil ==
- Eliana Calmon (born 1944)

== Cambodia ==
- Chef Nak (born 1985), celebrity chef and entrepreneur

== Canada ==
- Molly Lyons Bar-David (1910–1987)
- Jehane Benoît (1904–1987)
- Mary Berg (born 1989)
- Carleigh Bodrug
- Cecily Brownstone (1909–2005), food editor, cookbook writer
- Laura Calder
- Jessica Clark-Bojin
- Amanda Cohen
- Lynn Crawford (born 1964)
- Ayesha Curry (born 1989), chef, cookbook writer, television personality
- Christine Cushing (graduated 1986), Greek-born television chef, cookbook writer
- Brenda Davis
- Anne Desjardins (born 1951)
- Meeru Dhalwala, Indian-born restaurateur, cookbook writer
- Margaret Dickenson, cookbook writer since 1996, television personality
- Sue Donaldson (born 1962)
- Naomi Duguid (born 1950), photographer, cookbook writer
- Mary Jo Eustace (born 1962)
- Aida McAnn Flemming (1896–1994)
- Norene Gilletz (1940–2020), kosher cookbook writer
- Marilyn Hall (1927–2017)
- Anna Hansen (living)
- Candice Hutchings (born 1988), food blogger, YouTuber, cookbook writer
- Andrea Jourdan (born 1956)
- Emma Knight
- Sarah Kramer (1968–2025)
- Lisa MacLeod (born 1974)
- Marilou (born 1990)
- Dana McCauley (born 1966)
- Helen McCully (1902–1977)
- Vesanto Melina (born 1942)
- Marthe Miral (fl. 1934), collective pseudonym used by Maple Leaf Milling Company produced cookbooks translated into French
- Siue Moffat (born 1973), chocolatier, filmmaker, cookbook writer
- Marie Nightingale (1928–2014)
- Margo Oliver (1923–2010), radio and television cook, cookbook writer
- Anna Olson (born 1968)
- Renee Paquette
- Jean Paré (1927–2022), caterer, cookbook writer
- Greta and Janet Podleski
- Rose Reisman
- Tosca Reno (born 1959)
- Anna Lee Scott (fl. 1930s–1960s), house name used by Maple Leaf Milling Company produced cookbooks published in English
- Colleen Taylor Sen (born 1944), language teacher, translator, food and travel writer, cookbook writer
- Gail Simmons (born 1976)
- Mairlyn Smith
- Edna Staebler (1906–2006), literary journalist, cookbook writer
- Savella Stechishin (1903–2002)
- Anita Stewart (1947–2020), food activist, food and cookbook writer
- Lauren Toyota
- Julie Van Rosendaal
- Lucy Waverman, food journalist, columnist, cookbook writer

== China ==
- Yan-kit So (1933–2001), food historian, cookbook writer

== Cuba ==
- Nitza Villapol (1923–1998)

== Czech Republic ==
- Magdalena Dobromila Rettigová (1785–1845)

== Denmark ==
- Mette Blomsterberg (born 1970), pastry chef, restaurateur, cookbook writer
- Elfride Fibiger (1832–1911)
- Caroline Fleming (born 1975), entrepreneur, television personality, Danish cookbook writer
- Kristine Marie Jensen (1858–1923), highly popular Danish cookbook writer
- Anne Marie Mangor (1781–1865), pioneering Danish cookbook writer
- Louise Nimb (1842–1903)
- Helena Patursson (1864–1916), actress, feminist, playwright, writer, author of the first Faroese cookbook Matreglur fyri hvørt hús (Food-rules for every house, 1908)
- Bi Skaarup (1952–2014), archaeologist, food historian, non-fiction writer, curator
- Ingeborg Suhr Mailand (1871–1969)

== Dominican Republic ==
- Inés Páez Nin (born 1979)

== Estonia ==
- Liina Karron (born 1974), Estonian food writer and chef

== Finland ==
- Sara La Fountain (born 1981)
- Piitu Uski (born 1967)

== France ==
- Julie Andrieu (born 1974), photographer, television and radio host, cookbook writer
- Simone Beck (1904–1991), cookbook writer, cooking teacher, played important role in introducing French cooking into American kitchens
- Louisette Bertholle (1905–1999), chef, cookbook writer on French cuisine
- Sophie Bise
- Henriette Chandet (1901–1989)
- Clotilde Dusoulier (born 1979), food writer, blogger, cookbook writer in English and French
- Madeleine Kamman (1931–2018), chef, restaurateur, cookery teacher, cookbook writer
- Marie-Sophie L.
- Hélène Jawhara Piñer
- Mapie de Toulouse-Lautrec (1901–1972), journalist, cookbook writer
- Corinne Trang, author of cookbooks on Asian cuisine since 1999
- Georgiana Viou (born 1977)

== Germany ==
- Henriette Davidis (1801–1876), popular 19th-century German cookbook writer, author of Praktisches Kochbuch (1845)
- Susanna Eger (1640–1713), cook and cookbook writer, author of Leipziger Kochbuch (1706)
- Sabina Welserin, author of the early cookbook Das Kochbuch der Sabina Welserin (1553)
- Anna Wecker (died 1596), early cookbook writer
- Luisa Weiss (born 1977), Italian-American food writer, author of Classic German Baking (2016)
- Rebekka Wolf, early German-Jewish cookbook writer, published Kochbuch für israelitische Frauen in 1851

== Greece ==
- Aglaia Kremezi, Greek food journalist, educator, cookbook writer

== Guadeloupe ==
- Vanessa Bolosier, French Caribbean food writer, model, living in London since 2005

== India ==
- Tarla Dalal (1936–2013), chef, cookbook writer, television personality
- Ritu Dalmia (born 1973), chef, restaurateur, television personality, cookbook writer
- Bilkees I. Latif (c. 1930–2017), social work, writer, published Essential Andhra Cookbook (1999)
- Nita Mehta, Indian cookbook writer since the 1990s
- Mrs Balbir Singh (1912–1994), chef, cookery teacher, cookbook writer
- Beatrice A. Vieyra, author of the early cookbook on Indian cooking, Culinary Art Sparkles (1915)

== Iran ==
- Sanaz Minaie, chef, cookbook writer since 1978
- Roza Montazemi (c.1921–2009), cookbook writer

== Ireland ==
- Darina Allen (born 1948), cook, cookbook writer
- Rachel Allen (born 1972), chef, television personality, cookbook writer
- Trish Deseine (born 1964), cookbook writer, writing in French and English, television personality
- Theodora FitzGibbon (1916–1991), cookbook writer, model, actress
- Catherine Fulvio, cook, cookbook writer, television personality
- Maura Laverty (1907–1966), cookbook writer, novelist, journalist and broadcaster
- Clodagh McKenna (born 1975), cookbook writer, columnist, chef and television presenter
- Rozanna Purcell (born 1990), cook, cookbook writer, model, television personality

== Israel ==
- Jamie Geller (born 1978), American-born Israeli cookbook writer since 2007
- Janna Gur, Latvian-born emigrant to Israel in 1974, editor, cookbook writer on Israeli and Jewish cuisine

== Italy ==
- Ada Boni (1881–1973), magazine editor, cookbook writer
- Susanna Cutini (born 1962), chef, Italian cookbook writer
- Manuela Darling-Gansser (born 1950), cookbook writer, television personality, based in Australia

== Japan ==
- Miyuki Hatoyama (born 1943), wife of former Prime Minister Yukio Hatoyama, actress, interior designer, cookbook writer
- Asako Kishi (1923–2015), cookbook writer, journalist
- Katsuyo Kobayashi (1937–2014), cookbook writer, television personality
- Harumi Kurihara (born 1947), cookbook writer, television personality

== Mexico ==
- Elena Zelayeta (1898–1974), cookbook author

== Netherlands ==
- Wina Born (1920–2001), journalist, profuse cookbook writer and columnist
- Martine Wittop Koning (1870–1963), nutrition expert, cookbook writer
- E. M. Valk-Heijnsdijk (1867–1945), cookbook writer and restaurateur

== New Zealand ==
- Annabel Langbein (born 1958), cookbook writer since 1988
- Annabelle White, food columnist, cookbook writer since 1997
- Chelsea Winter, winner of third New Zealand masterchef; went on to write at least four cookbooks
- Susan Parkinson (1920–2012), nutritionist who worked in Fiji and the South Pacific

== Norway ==
- Wenche Andersen (born 1954), chef, television personality, cookbook writer
- Maren Elisabeth Bang (1797–1884), wrote the first Norwegian cookbook to be printed: Huusholdnings-Bog, indrettet efter den almindelige Brug i norske Huusholdninger (1831)
- Dorothea Christensen (1847–1908), educator, cookbook writer, author of Norway's first cookery textbook Kogebog for Folkeskole og Hjemmet (1891)
- Henriette Schønberg Erken (1866–1953), popular cookbook writer
- Ingrid Espelid Hovig (1924–2018), chef, television personality, cookbook writer
- Marit Kolby (born 1975), nutritional biologist, cookbook writer
- Karen Splid Møller (1800–1880), author of the handwritten Moldegård Cookbook begun in 1819
- Hanna Winsnes (1789–1872), poet, Norway's first female novelist, author of the early cookbook Lærebog i de forskjellige Grene af Huusholdningen (1845)

== Poland ==
- Lucyna Ćwierciakiewiczowa (1829–February 1901), author of the popular Polish-language cookbook Jedyne praktyczne przepisy wszelkich zapasów spiżarnianych oraz pieczenia ciast (The only practical compendium of recipes for all household stocks and pastry) (1858)
- Wincenta Zawadzka (c. 1824–1894), author of the popular Polish-language cookbook Kucharka litewska (1843)

== Romania ==
- Simona Lazăr (or Simona Nicoleta Lazăr) (born 1968), journalist, gastronome, food critic, cookbook writer, publisher, author of many culinary books and studies about history of gastronomy and cookbooks

== Serbia ==
- Spasenija Pata Marković (1881–1974)

== Slovakia ==
- Zdena Studenková (born 1954), actress, singer, cookbook writer

== South Korea ==
- Chang Kyehyang (1598–1680), poet, thinker, welfare worker, Asia's first female cookbook writer 음식디미방 (1670)

== Spain ==
- Carmen de Burgos (1867–1932), journalist, writer, author of ¿Quiere usted comer bien?
- Miriam González Durántez (born 1968), Spanish lawyer and cookbook writer

== Sweden ==
- Gustafva Björklund (1794–1862), Finnish-born restaurateur, cookbook writer
- Margareta Elzberg (fl. 1751), author of the first authentic Swedish cookbook
- Lotta Lundgren (born 1971), television presenter, cookbook writer
- Tina Nordström (born 1973), chef, television personality, cookbook writer
- Sofia von Porat (born 1989), travel writer, cookbook writer
- Anna Maria Rückerschöld (1725–1805), housekeeping specialist, cookbook writer
- Cajsa Warg (1703–1769), pioneering cookbook writer
- Johanna Westman (born 1969), television host, children's writer, cookbook writer

== Switzerland ==
- Maria Susanna Kübler (1814–1873), German-speaking Swiss writer, housekeeping guides and cookbooks

== Taiwan ==
- Fu Pei-mei (1931–2004)

== Ukraine ==
- Olha Franko (1896–1987), creator of first Ukrainian cookbook

== United Kingdom ==
- Eliza Acton (1799–1859), poet, cook, early cookbook writer, author of the influential Modern Cookery for Private Families (1845)
- Zoe Adjonyoh (born 1977), British writer and cook
- Gretel Beer (1921–2010), Austrian-born cookbook and travel writer, columnist
- Isabella Beeton (1836–1865), author of Mrs Beeton's Book of Household Management, 1861
- Mary Berry (born 1935), television presenter, cookbook writer
- Ravinder Bhogal, Kenyan-born British chef, since 2010 food writer and television host
- Margaret Blatch (1886–1963), chef, restaurateur, cookbook writer
- Mrs. Bowdich (1861–1930), writer, author of New Vegetarian Dishes (1892)
- Susan Brookes (born 1943), resident chef on This Morning, television presenter and cookbook writer
- Martha Brotherton (bapt. 1782–1861), cookbook writer and author of the first vegetarian cookbook, Vegetable Cookery (1812)
- Sarah Brown, author of Sarah Brown's Vegetarian Kitchen and television series
- May Byron (1861–1936), writer, poet and cookbook writer
- Deborah Cavendish, Duchess of Devonshire (1920–2014), writer, socialite
- Fanny Cradock (1909–1994), restaurant critic, television cook, cookbook writer
- Elizabeth Craig (1883-1980), Scottish author, journalist and home economist
- Sophie Dahl (born 1977), model, cookbook writer, television presenter
- Elizabeth David (1913–1992), cookbook writer, covering French, Italian and British cooking, author of the influential 1950 A Book of Mediterranean Food
- Anna Del Conte (born 1925), Italian-born food and cookbook writer
- Josceline Dimbleby (born 1943), food columnist, cookbook writer
- Fuchsia Dunlop, cookbook writer since 2001, specializing in Chinese cuisine
- Harry Eastwood (born c.1980), chef, cookbook writer, television personality
- Rose Elliot (born 1945), author of vegetarian cookbooks, starting with Simply Delicious (1967)
- Lady Elinor Fettiplace (c.1570 – in or after 1647), compiler of a manuscript book, now known under the title Elinor Fettiplace's Receipt Book, dated 1604
- Florence A. George (1864 – 3 July 1918), English schoolteacher and cookbook writer
- Sabrina Ghayour (born 1976), Iranian-born chef and cookbook writer
- Hannah Glasse (1708–1770), pioneering cookbook writer, published The Art of Cookery made Plain and Easy in 1747
- Vivien Goldman (born 1954), journalist, cookbook writer, musician
- Patience Gray (1917–2005), cookbook and travel writer
- Jane Grigson (1928–1990), cookbook writer
- Sophie Grigson (born 1959), columnist, cookbook writer
- Christian Guthrie Wright (1844–1907), educator, co-founder of the Edinburgh School of Cookery, cookbook writer
- Kate Halford (1862–1938), cookbook writer in the 1910s
- Dorothy Hartley (1893–1985), author of Food in England (1954)
- Anissa Helou (born 1952), chef, cookbook writer, specializing in Mediterranean, Middle East, and North African cuisines
- Margot Henderson (born 1964), chef, caterer, cookery writer
- Mary Hooper (1829–1904), novelist, children's writer, cookbook writer
- Elizabeth Horsell (1798–1874), Activist and writer, published an early vegan cookbook
- Ching He Huang (born 1978), British Taiwanese food writer and television chef
- Madhur Jaffrey (born 1933), Indian-born actress, food and travel writer, and television personality
- Jeanne Jardine, domestic and culinary writer
- Anna Jones (born 1979), chef, writer, and author
- Diana Kennedy (1923–2022), cookbook writer, specializing in Mexican cuisine
- Rachel Khoo (born 1980), cook, broadcaster, cookbook writer
- Janet Laurence (born 1937), novelist, cookbook writer
- Nigella Lawson (born 1960), cook, television personality
- Pinky Lilani (born 1954), Indian-born writer, food expert, feminist
- Ruth Lowinsky (1893–1958), society hostess, cookbook writer
- Veronica Maclean (1920–2005), hotelier, cookbook writer
- Agnes Catherine Maitland (1850–1906), principal of Somerville College, Oxford, cookbook writer
- Elizabeth Marshall (fl. 1770–1790), cookery educator, cookbook writer
- Mary McCartney (born 1969), photographer, vegetarian cookery writer
- F. Marian McNeill (1885–1973)
- Thomasina Miers (born 1976), cook, writer, restaurateur, television presenter
- Hallie Eustace Miles (1855–1947), writer, restaurateur, and activist
- Countess Morphy (c.1874–1938), American-born dance writer, cookbook writer
- Elizabeth Moxon (fl. 1740–1754), pioneering cookbook writer, author of the influential English Housewifry
- Florence I. Nicholson (1866–1931), vegetarian cookbook writer
- Eleanor E. Orlebar (1841–1906), novelist and vegetarian cookbook writer
- Elisabeth Lambert Ortiz (1915–2003), cookbook writer specializing in Latin American cuisine
- Stasha Palos (born 1972), artist, cookbook writer
- Marguerite Patten (1915–2015), home economist, broadcaster, cookbook writer
- Constance Peel (1868–1934), journalist, household management specialist, cookbook writer
- Mary Pope, cookery teacher and writer
- Rose Prince (born 1962), cookbook writer
- Elizabeth Raffald (1733–1781), businesswoman, author of The Experienced English Housekeeper (1769)
- Claudia Roden (born 1936), Egyptian-born cultural anthropologist, cookbook writer
- Evelyn Rose (1925–2003), Anglo-Jewish cookbook writer, broadcaster
- Janet Ross (1842–1927), historian, biographer, cookbook writer
- Maria Eliza Rundell (1745–1828), author of A New System of Domestic Cookery (1806)
- Rejina Sabur-Cross (born 1974), cookbook writer, blogger
- Jane Scott, Duchess of Buccleuch (1929–2011), model, cookbook writer
- Delia Smith (born 1941), cook, author, TV presenter, businesswoman
- Eliza Smith (died c.1732), cookbook writer, author of the popular The Compleat Housewife (1727)
- Sarah St. John (1669–1755), clergyman's wife, maintained a manuscript recipe book
- Katie Stewart (1934–2013), food columnist, cookbook writer
- Caroline Waldegrave (born 1952), wine entrepreneur, cookbook writer
- Anne Willan (born 1938), food educator, food and cookbook writer
- Amy Willcock, American-born cookbook writer since 2002

== United States ==
=== A ===
- Mandy Aftel (born 1948), perfumer and cookbook author
- Barbara Albright (1955–2006), author of cookbooks and books on knitting
- Ida Bailey Allen (1885–1973), food editor, chef, restaurateur, cookbook writer
- Jackie Alpers (born 1968), cookbook author, food photographer
- Jean Anderson (1929–2023), editor, food columnist, cookbook writer
- Akiko Aoyagi (born 1950), cookbook writer and artist

=== B ===
- Lidia Bastianich (born 1947), chef, television personality, cookbook writer, restaurateur
- Najmieh Batmanglij (born 1947), Iranian-American chef, cookbook writer
- Ann Bauer (born 1966), essayist, novelist, cookbook writer
- Esther Bradford Aresty (1908–2000), culinary historian, cookbook writer
- Susan Branch (born 1947), painter, designer, writer, cookbook writer
- Celia Brooks Brown (born 1970), chef, cookbook writer, television host, based in London
- Helen Evans Brown (1904–1964), cookbook writer, columnist, authority on west coast food, culinary historian, cookbook collector
- Gesine Bullock-Prado (born 1970), pastry chef, cookbook writer, attorney, former film executive
- Marian Burros, food columnist, cookbook writer since 1962
- Jane Butel, television presenter, cookbook writer since 1980, specializing in Tex-Mex cooking
- Anne Byrn (graduated 1978), journalist, food editor, cookbook writer

=== C ===
- Biba Caggiano (1936–2019), Italian-born restaurateur, television presenter and Italian cookbook writer since 1986
- Karyn Calabrese (born 1947), restaurateur, cookbook writer
- Mary Jane Goodson Carlisle (1835–1905), Acting First Lady of the United States
- Penelope Casas (1943–2013), cookbook writer specializing in Spanish cooking
- Irena Chalmers (1935–2020), food commentator, essayist, cookbook writer
- Leah Chase (1923–2019), Creole chef, cookbook writer
- Joyce Chen (1917–1994), Chinese-American chef, cookbook writer, television personality
- Andrea Chesman, cookbook writer since 1999
- Julia Child (1912–2004), chef, cookbook writer, television personality, specialized in French cuisine
- Leeann Chin (1933–2010), Chinese-born American restaurateur, cookbook writer
- Grace Zia Chu (1899–1999), influential American-Chinese chef, cookbook writer
- Anna L. Colcord (1864–1950), writer and editor
- Shirley Corriher (born 1935), biochemist, cookbook writer
- Chloe Coscarelli (born 1987), vegan chef, cookbook writer
- Mildred Cotton Council (1929–2018), restaurateur, cookbook author
- Marion Cunningham (1922–2012), cookbook editor and writer

=== D ===
- Melissa d'Arabian (born 1968), chef, television personality, cookbook writer
- Anni Daulter, American cookbook writer
- Giada De Laurentiis (born 1970), Italian-born chef, television personality, cookbook writer
- Erica De Mane (born 1953), chef, cookbook writer, teacher, specializing in Italian cuisine
- Paula Deen (born 1947), chef, television personality, cookbook writer
- Nikki Dinki (born 1983), chef, cookbook writer, blogger
- Crescent Dragonwagon (born 1952), novelist, poet, cookbook writer
- Ree Drummond (born 1969), cookbook writer, photographer, television personality, blogger
- Nathalie Dupree (born 1939), chef, television presenter, cookbook writer

=== E ===
- Renee Erickson (born 1972), Seattle chef and cookbook writer
- Mary Ann Esposito (born 1942), chef, cookbook writer, host of Ciao Italia with Mary Ann Esposito since 1989

=== F ===
- Florence Fabricant, food critic and cookbook writer since 1972
- Lisa Fain, food writer, blogger, cookbook writer
- Fannie Farmer (1857–1915), American/Canadian culinary expert, cookbook writer who introduced standardized measuring
- Susie Fishbein (born 1968), Jewish kosher cookbook writer
- Zonya Foco (born 1963), nutritionist, television personality, cookbook writer on healthy eating

=== G ===
- Beverly Gannon (born c.1949), Hawaiian chef, restaurateur, cookbook writer
- Ina Garten (born 1948), television personality, cookbook writer
- Maria McIlvaine Gillmore (1871–1965), cookbook writer and missionary
- Teresa Giudice (born 1972), television personality, cookbook writer
- Meta Given (1888–1981), nutritionist, cookbook writer
- Darra Goldstein (born 1951), Russian professor, cookbook writer and editor
- Aliza Green, cookbook writer since 1997
- Barbara Grunes (born 1941), food consultant, cookbook writer

=== H ===
- Jaden Hair, Hong Kong-born American chef, food columnist and photographer, active since 2007
- June Hersh, Kosher cookbook writer
- Amanda Hesser (born 1971), food editor, cookbook writer
- Janet McKenzie Hill (1852–1933), nutritionist, cookbook writer
- Elizabeth O. Hiller (circa 1856–1941), cookbook writer and professor of culinary arts
- Ingrid Hoffmann (born 1965), Colombian-American restaurateur, television personality and cookbook writer
- Annemarie Huste (1943–2016), German chef and cookbook writer

=== I ===
- Antonia Isola (born 1876), author of the first Italian cookbook published in the United States

=== J ===
- Madhur Jaffrey (born 1933), Indian-born actress, food and travel writer, television personality
- Pati Jinich (born 1972), Mexican-American chef, television personality, cookbook writer
- Jenny Jones (born 1946), television presenter, comedian, cookbook writer
- Judith Jones (1924–2017), literary editor, cookbook writer

=== K ===
- Barbara Kafka (1933–2018)
- Mollie Katzen (born 1950), chef, cookbook writer, specializing in vegetarian cuisine
- Bethany Kehdy (born 1981), Lebanese-American culinary expert and cookbook writer
- Carol Kicinski, television chef, magazine editor, gluten-free cookbook writer
- Lauretta Eby Kress (1863–1955), physician and vegetarian cookbook writer
- Candice Kumai, chef, cookbook writer since 2009

=== L ===
- Padma Lakshmi (born 1970), Indian-born actress, television personality, cookbook writer
- Almeda Lambert (1864–1921), cookbook writer and businessperson
- Frances Moore Lappé (born 1944), nutritionist, non-fiction writer, cookbook writer
- Katie Lee (born 1981), chef, novelist, food critic, cookbook writer
- Sandra Lee (born 1966), television chef, cookbook writer
- Aliya LeeKong (born 1978), chef, television personality, cookbook writer
- Eileen Yin-Fei Lo (1937–2022), Chinese-born chef, cookbook writer since the 1970s
- Kasma Loha-unchit (born 1950), Thai-born cookbook writer
- Cathy Luchetti (born 1945), non-fiction writer, cookbook and food writer
- Sheila Lukins (1942–2009), food and cookbook writer, columnist
- Barbara Lynch, since 1998 restaurateur, cookbook writer

=== M ===
- Deborah Madison (graduated 1968), food and cookbook writer, vegetarian specialist
- Sarah Helen Mahammitt (c. 1873–1956), cookbook writer, cooking teacher
- Robynne Maii
- Daisy Martinez, actress, model, television personality, chef and cookbook writer
- Barbara Abdeni Massaad (born 1970), Lebanese-American cookbook writer, photographer, television personality
- Judy Mazel (1943–2007), nutritionist, cookbook writer
- Mary Margaret McBride (1899–1976), radio host and cookbook author
- Tracye McQuirter, vegan activist and cookbook writer
- Alice Medrich, cookbook writer since the 1990s, specializing in chocolate desserts
- Whitney Miller (born 1988), food writer, television chef
- Mary Sue Milliken, chef, restaurateur, television personality, cookbook writer since 1898
- Julie Montagu (born 1972), cookbook writer, yoga teacher
- Sara Moulton (born 1952), chef, television personality, cookbook writer

=== N ===
- Joan Nathan (born 1943), since 1975 cookbook writer, specializing in Jewish cooking
- Asenath Nicholson (1792–1855), vegetarian and vegan cookbook writer

=== O ===
- Mildred Ellen Orton (1911–2010), business woman, cookbook writer
- Daphne Oz (born 1986), journalist, television personality, cookbook writer

=== P ===
- Gwyneth Paltrow (born 1972), actress, singer, cookbook writer
- Petra Paredez, pastry chef, cookbook author
- Pauline Dunwell Partridge (1879–1944), American writer
- Evora Bucknum Perkins (1851–1929), American educator, cookbook writer, and missionary
- Ani Phyo (born 1968), Canadian-born organic chef, cookbook writer
- Thelma Pressman (1921–2010), microwave cookery specialist, cookbook writer

=== R ===
- Mary Randolph (1762–1828), cookbook writer, author of The Virginia House-Wife (1824)
- Rachael Ray (born 1968), chef, television personality, cookbook writer
- Ruth Reichl (born 1948), food editor, cookbook writer
- Kay Robertson (born 1947), television personality, cookbook writer
- Sallie Ann Robinson, cookbook writer since 2003
- Irma S. Rombauer (1877–1962), cookbook writer, author of The Joy of Cooking (1931)
- Mary Swartz Rose (1874–1941), nutritionist, food writer

=== S ===
- Alice G. Schirmer (1875–1935), nurse and cookbook writer
- Mildred Brown Schrumpf (1903–2001), food columnist, educator, and cookbook writer
- Carolyn Scott-Hamilton, Colombian-born journalist, television personality and, since 2012, cookbook writer
- Jessica Seinfeld (born 1971), cookbook writer
- Kim Severson (born 1961), columnist and cookbook writer
- Louisa Shafia (born 1969 or 1970), Iranian-American chef and cookbook author
- Martha Rose Shulman, cookbook writer, cooking teacher, and food columnist
- Harriet Hayes Skinner (1817–1893), cookbook writer
- Susan Spungen, food writer, editor, and food stylist
- Martha Stewart (born 1941), entrepreneur, television personality, media pioneer, first American female self-made billionaire, cookbook writer

=== T ===
- Mary Virginia Terhune (1830–1922), novelist, non-fiction writer, cookbook writer (Marion Harland)
- Amy Thielen (graduated 1997), chef, food writer, television personality
- Christina Tosi (born 1981), chef, television personality, cookbook writer

=== V ===
- Marcela Valladolid (born 1978), chef, television personality, cookbook writer on Mexican cuisine
- Jeanne Voltz (1920–2002), food editor and cookbook author

=== W ===
- Danielle Walker (born 1985), gluten-free food writer, cookbook writer
- Alice Waters (born 1944), chef, restaurateur, cookbook writer
- Patricia Wells (born 1946), restaurant critic, cookbook writer
- Alexandra Wentworth (born 1965), actress, cookbook writer
- Caroline Randall Williams (born 1987), educator, poet, cookbook writer
- Virginia Willis (born 1966), chef, photographer, cookbook writer
- Paula Wolfert (born 1938), cookbook writer specializing in Mediterranean food

=== Y ===
- Sherry Yard (born 1964), chef, restaurateur, cookbook writer
- Trisha Yearwood (born 1964), singer, actress, cookbook writer, television personality
- Dina Yuen, industrial engineer, musician, entrepreneur, cookbook writer on Indonesian cooking

== See also ==
- List of cookbook writers
