= List of In the Heat of the Night episodes =

This is a list of episodes of the television series In the Heat of the Night, which aired from 1988 to 1995.

== Series overview ==
Season	Episodes	Originally released			Rank	Rating
Season	Episodes	First released	Last released	Network	Rank	Rating
1	8	March 6, 1988	May 3, 1988	NBC	19	17.0
2	22	December 4, 1988	May 16, 1989	NBC	19	17.3
3	22	October 24, 1989	May 8, 1990	NBC	17	17.3
4	22	September 18, 1990	April 30, 1991	NBC	19	15.2
5	22	October 1, 1991	May 19, 1992	NBC	30	13.1
6	22	October 28, 1992	May 12, 1993	CBS	37	11.9
7	24	September 16, 1993	May 11, 1994	CBS	63	10.3
TV films	4	October 21, 1994	May 16, 1995	CBS	—N/a	—N/a

== Episodes ==
=== Season 1 (1988) ===
No. overall	No. in season	Title	Directed by	Written by	Original release date	Prod. code	Rating/share (households)
1	1	"Pilot: Part 1"	David Hemmings	James Lee Barrett	March 6, 1988	7801A	18.7/30
Detective Virgil Tibbs returns to Sparta for his mother's funeral and joins the police force as chief of detectives. His arrival is met with resistance from police chief Bill Gillespie – who, despite his good relationship with Tibbs, resents having an officer hired without his approval. Virgil has trouble adjusting to the small, antiquated police force. Tibbs' first case is a racially charged murder case that is soon complicated when the suspect is murdered in his cell. Doug Savant and Kevin McCarthy guest star.
2	2	"Pilot: Part 2"	David Hemmings	James Lee Barrett	March 6, 1988	7801B	18.7/30
The investigation into the brutal murders of a young girl and the suspect in her death, leads Tibbs and Gillespie to the son of one of Sparta's wealthiest and most influential citizens. As they come closer to the truth matters become dangerous for Virgil.
3	3	"Road Kill"	Leo Penn	Kathy McCormick	March 15, 1988	7802	17.9/28
The affair between a wealthy, alcoholic woman's husband and her distant cousin leads to the wife's murder. Virgil immediately suspects the adulterous pair. But he has a difficult time persuading Gillespie, who is a longtime friend of the husband, and Bubba, who has been seeing the cousin. Bubba and Virgil clash again and Virgil is frustrated when the Chief rejects his theory about the crime.
4	4	"Fate"	Anthony Wilkinson	Richard Fielder	March 22, 1988	7804	16.8/26
Racial tensions run high when a married white woman has an affair with a black businessman from New York. Meanwhile Virgil is not happy when the Chief enlists his aid in tracking down Bubba's cousin, a suspected moonshiner.
5	5	"Blind Spot: Part 1"	David Hemmings	William Gray	March 29, 1988	7805	17.4/28
Virgil refuses to let go of a grudge against a wealthy former classmate from high school who cheated the latter out of a scholarship. The man has promised city leaders that he will move his business to Sparta, but not all of his business interests are legal. The nephew of an old friend of Gillespie's finds his life in danger after he steals drugs stored in the businessman's mansion.
6	6	"Blind Spot: Part 2"	David Hemmings	William Gray	April 5, 1988	7806	16.5/26
An angry Gillespie seeks answers when an old friend is shot. And Virgil narrowly escapes death after trying to ascertain the real reason behind an old adversary's return to Sparta. Nan finds herself in danger after she finds out the truth about her new love.
7	7	"A Necessary Evil"	Winrich Kolbe	Josef Anderson	April 12, 1988	7803	16.5/26
In this humorous episode, Virgil and the Chief arrest a bible salesman (guest star Ted Lange) for bigamy. It soon becomes a polygamy case after an endless parade of wives (six total) come to visit their husband, who later turns up murdered in his cell. Did any of his wives kill him?
8	8	"...And Then You Die"	Anthony Wilkinson	Kathy McCormick	May 3, 1988	7807	13.6/21
The Sparta police search for a killer and his girlfriend (Mariska Hargitay). But the case becomes personal when they take Althea and the grandson of one of the victims hostage.

=== Season 2 (1988–89) ===
No. overall	No. in season	Title	Directed by	Written by	Original release date	Prod. code	Viewers (millions)
9	1	"Don't Look Back"	Peter Levin	Jeri Taylor & David Moessinger	December 4, 1988	8804A	27.6
10	2	"Don't Look Back"	Peter Levin	Jeri Taylor & David Moessinger	December 4, 1988	8804B	27.6
A copycat recreates a shocking unsolved murder from 20 years earlier. Gillespie feels threatened after Ted Marcus suggests that Virgil should become the Chief. The situation becomes more tense after Virgil criticizes the actions of Parker and Bubba. Tibbs, Gillespie and Bubba pursue different leads in an unusual murder case and the Chief realizes that the killer has plans for him. Trivia: Sparta celebrates 150 year anniversary of its founding; neither Tibbs nor Gillespie can find out who killed the original murder victim of 20 years before—whether it was her estranged husband or her current lover, both of whom are now dead. The series location has changed from Hammond, Louisiana to Covington, Georgia.
11	3	"The Family Secret"	Lee H. Katzin	Nancy Bond	December 6, 1988	8801	23.9
The murder of a well-respected man turns up a shocking secret about his family.
12	4	"The Hammer and the Glove"	Harry Harris	Jeri Taylor	December 13, 1988	8806	24.2
Virgil is delighted when Matthew Pogue (Michael Warren) his former partner from Philadelphia comes to visit. But he soon learns his friend has another purpose for coming to Sparta. Althea is uncomfortable because she and Matthew were romantically involved before she met Virgil and she realizes that he is unwilling to accept the fact that she chose Virgil over him. Meanwhile the F.B.I. enlist Sparta P.D.'s aid in hiding a witness.
13	5	"Prisoners"	Russ Mayberry	Lee Maddux	December 20, 1988	8805	24.6
Sweet risks his life to prove that the Sheriff (Ed Ames) of a neighboring county is guilty of the racially motivated murder of a young man that Sweet was friends with back in elementary school. Friendship also leads to a conflict for Gillespie, who also happens to have been old friends with the sheriff.
14	6	"Hot Nights"	Harry Harris	Mark Edens	December 27, 1988	8807	26.7
Bubba is seduced by an alluring writer (Barbara Stock) who has more on her mind than romance. Gillespie and Virgil worry that he is in over his head. Bubba tries to protect her from her estranged husband, but matters get complicated after she shoots someone.
15	7	"Gunshot"	Lee H. Katzin	David Moessinger	January 3, 1989	8811	24.5
Virgil is forced to shoot a suspect in an armed robbery. He has trouble dealing with the consequences of his actions, after he realizes the person he shot was a teenaged girl – and no one can locate the gun he believed she was pointing at him.
16	8	"Country Mouse, City Mouse"	Vincent McEveety	Lee Maddux	January 10, 1989	8812	29.6
Virgil's visiting niece and Bubba's nephew team up in an effort to escape the boredom of small-town life, but they get more excitement than they bargained for when they cross paths with a dangerous parolee.
17	9	"Stranger in Town"	Michael Rhodes	Jordan Budde	January 17, 1989	8802	28.5
Gillespie suspects that JoAnn's new cook is connected to the murder of a young prostitute. But Virgil suspects the culprit maybe a local pimp who has been intimidating the women.
18	10	"Tear Down the Walls"	Vincent McEveety	Terry Erwin	January 31, 1989	8808	25.2
A minister attempting to integrate his all-white church by inviting Virgil and Althea to services is found murdered.
19	11	"A Trip Upstate"	Jeffrey Hayden	Carroll O'Connor	February 7, 1989	8803	22.9
In this thought provoking episode, Gillespie is surprised when a man he arrested asks to see him on the eve of his execution. He must confront his feelings about the death penalty when the prisoner asks him to witness his death. The first of 27 episodes of the series written by Carroll O'Connor.
20	12	"A.K.A. Kelly Kay"	Chuck Bowman	Lee Maddux	February 14, 1989	8813	27.5
The past comes back to haunt JoAnn in the form of an escaped convict.
21	13	"These Things Take Time"	Michael Rhodes	Nancy Bond	February 21, 1989	8809	28.4
A teenage mother from an impoverished family is arrested for murder after her infant is found dead, but Virgil believes there is more to the case than meets the eye. Meanwhile, Althea believes the situation could have been prevented if the school had offered sex education classes.
22	14	"Intruders"	Chuck Bowman	Steven Baum	March 7, 1989	8817	25.5
The police search for a burglar who preys on elderly women. And the prime suspect is the son of a city councilwoman.
23	15	"The Creek"	Alexander Singer	Jo William Philipp	March 14, 1989	8810	25.3
The investigation of a possible assault brings back nightmarish and confusing childhood memories for Virgil.
24	16	"Sister, Sister"	Lee H. Katzin	Carol Saraceno	March 21, 1989	8818	22.3
A vivacious socialite's return to Sparta delights her ailing father and childhood friend Virgil, but her sister is less than thrilled at her homecoming. After their father is poisoned, the jealous siblings become suspects in his murder.
25	17	"Walkout"	Russ Mayberry	Steven Aspis	March 28, 1989	8816	24.9
A bitter labor strike at a local factory leads to a murder investigation on a snowy day in Sparta. O. J. Simpson guest stars.
26	18	"Accused"	Chuck Bowman	James Novack	April 4, 1989	8820	24.2
Bubba tries to rescue a woman (Vanessa Bell Calloway) from a rapist, but she mistakes him for her attacker. Gillespie tangles with an ambitious district attorney who plans to use the case to further his career.
27	19	"Fifteen Forever"	Vincent McEveety	Nancy Bond	April 25, 1989	8814	24.6
Sparta grieves after a drunk driver causes a fatal crash with high school cheerleaders on their way home from a game. While the police try to find the drunk driver, Althea tries to help the victim's families deal with their loss. The accident brings back painful memories for retired police captain Tom Dugan (Joe Don Baker). Meanwhile, district attorney Dutton accuses the department of being inadequate. Starting with this episode, star Carroll O'Connor will remain absent for the remainder of the season, due to undergoing heart surgery. He will return in the season finale to set up the season cliffhanger.
28	20	"Ladybug, Ladybug"	Alexander Singer	Terry Erwin	May 2, 1989	8815	22.1
With the Chief in Quantico, Bubba and Virgil try to catch a serial arsonist. Matters get complicated after a man dies in one of the fires. And Councilwoman White stirs things up by appointing Tom Dugan acting chief of police in Gillespie's absence. Meanwhile, Bubba helps a young man, who is seduced by the arsonist's girlfriend, with the license tags of his car.
29	21	"The Pig Woman of Sparta"	David Moessinger	Story by : Marc Taylor; Teleplay by : Frank Dandridge	May 9, 1989	8821	27.7
It seems that a serial killer has been burying his victims in a wooded area owned by a wealthy hermit that Virgil refers to as "Sparta's Howard Hughes". Suspicion immediately falls on an eccentric woman (guest star Shirley Stoler) who lives in the woods with her pigs and chases away trespassers with a shotgun. The officers ask the landowner's disturbed son for help and Bubba is surprised to find that a woman he attended high school with is working as the man's "nurse". Also Parker and Sweet compete with one another to solve the case.
30	22	"Missing"	Alexander Singer	David Rupel	May 16, 1989	8819	23.1
Gillespie is kidnapped and Virgil believes that Tom Dugan is involved. Dugan is murdered in a cliffhanger ending. This episode's storyline continues in the sixth episode of the following season, "Anniversary".

=== Season 3 (1989–90) ===
No. overall	No. in season	Title	Directed by	Written by	Original release date	Prod. code	Viewers (millions)
31	1	"Rape"	Paul Lynch	Nancy Bond	October 24, 1989	9803	27.6
Althea is raped in her kitchen by Sparta High School's new music teacher, Stephen Ainslee (Ken Marshall), as she returns home from the supermarket one afternoon after school. Althea maintains that Ainslee raped her even though she never saw his face, but she recognized his voice, which isn't enough for new D.A. Gerard Darnelle to charge him on. Linda Ainslee, Ainslee's wife, provides him with a false alibi by claiming that they were at home when Althea was raped, thus complicating the charge against her husband. An enraged Virgil struggles to keep his anger under control, but it boils over when Ainslee tries to intimidate Althea into keeping quiet about the rape, prompting Virgil to physically attack Ainslee in front of his house. Meanwhile, Chief Gillespie tries to convince Linda to tell the truth about her husband's actions. Note: It was originally scheduled to air on October 17, 1989, but it was preempted due to the NBC News live coverage of the Loma Prieta earthquake.
32	2	"Fairest of Them All"	Mario Azzopardi	Edward DeBlasio	October 31, 1989	9801	27.7
A beauty pageant is marred by blackmail and the ambitious mother of one of the contestants.
33	3	"Murder Most Ancient"	Winrich Kolbe	Story by : Adrian Spies; Teleplay by : Edward DeBlasio	November 7, 1989	9807	22.9
An unhappy wife asks her lover to place a bomb in her abusive husband's Cadillac.
34	4	"First Girl"	Gene Reynolds	Carroll O'Connor	November 14, 1989	9802	24.9
Sparta P.D. gets its first black policewoman, Officer Christine Rankin. She is shot and killed on her first day on duty, and Gillespie tracks down her killer. The late Officer Rankin is replaced at the end of the episode by Officer Luanne Corbin (Crystal R. Fox).
35	5	"Crackdown"	E.W. Swackhamer	Nancy Bond	November 21, 1989	9810	23.0
Someone is selling crack to teenagers and Sweet tries desperately to save a young addict (Dana Barron).
36	6	"Anniversary"	Harry Harris	Mark Rodgers	November 28, 1989	9812	24.8
Conclusion of "Missing". After being released by his captors, the chief discovers that his abduction is part of a plot to assassinate a visiting civil rights leader. This episode was originally supposed to air at the beginning of the third season. The story is presented via a framing device of Chief Gillespie recounting the events after the fact.
37	7	"Time of the Stranger"	Ivan Dixon	Mark Rodgers	December 5, 1989	9804	22.5
After a private investigator searching for a missing child is found dead, the evidence points to a local dance teacher – a neighbor that Parker has become very fond of.
38	8	"Vengeance"	E.W. Swackhamer	Mark Rodgers	December 12, 1989	9817	25.7
The Wormlees, an outlaw family, seek revenge against Bubba after he is forced to shoot one of them during a convenience store holdup. Gillespie wants him to stay out of sight until they are all arrested – a suggestion that does not set well with Bubba.
39	9	"My Name Is Hank"	Harry Harris	Edward DeBlasio	December 19, 1989	9815	26.1
A young refugee claims to be the son of a Sparta cop who died in the Vietnam War. But he quickly becomes a suspect in a murder/robbery after he accepts a ride with the criminals who actually committed the crime. Gillespie looks into his story, while Virgil and the boys track down the shooter. Meanwhile, the young man's presence triggers a surprisingly bitter reaction from Parker, who views him as a painful reminder of the war.
40	10	"King's Ransom"	Jeffrey Hayden	Kim Friese & Carroll O'Connor	January 2, 1990	9814	27.0
The F.B.I. tries to talk an ex-boxer into testifying against a mobster he once worked for, but the boxer sees the situation as an opportunity for blackmail.
41	11	"Epitaph for a Lady"	Vincent McEveety	Steven Baum	January 16, 1990	9805	25.3
A longtime friend of Gillespie makes threats against a doctor he believes is responsible for his wife's death. When the doctor is killed, he becomes the prime suspect. But Gillespie doubts his guilt – even after he confesses.
42	12	"Triangle"	Chuck Bowman	Rick Kelbaugh	January 23, 1990	9818	27.5
Family man John Severance shoots and kills his wife Marge and her lover after he catches them in bed together, then flees to a remote cabin with his daughter, who does not know what he has done. Gillespie and his men hope to talk John into surrendering without resorting to violence and reconciling with his son.
43	13	"Hello in There"	Vincent McEveety	Cynthia Deming & William Royce	January 30, 1990	9821	25.3
Daryl Tyler, an old high school friend and ex-football teammate of Bubba's, commits suicide, and as a result, Daryl's 8-year-old son Odell refuses to speak after he sees it happen. Bubba doubts the circumstances surrounding Daryl's suicide, in which Daryl allegedly stole $100,000 from the bank where he worked, and thus sets out to prove that Daryl was actually framed for the theft and then murdered to make it look like he killed himself. Harriet uses art therapy to help Odell speak again, but then Odell becomes a target when his father's killer realizes that he witnessed the crime.
44	14	"December Days"	Vincent McEveety	Kim Friese	February 6, 1990	9816	22.3
The Sparta police investigate a suspicious death in a nursing home. Ken Curtis guest stars.
45	15	"A Loss of Innocence"	Paul Lynch	Story by : William Royce & Cynthia Deming & Stephen Schneck; Teleplay by : William Royce & Cynthia Deming	February 20, 1990	9823	24.9
D.A. Darnelle plans on indicting a teenager for murder after her father's remains are found in the basement and her mother turns up missing. But Gillespie and his men don't believe she is guilty.
46	16	"Bubba's Baby"	Jeffrey Hayden	Story by : Edward DeBlasio; Teleplay by : Cynthia Deming & William Royce	February 27, 1990	9820	27.2
Someone leaves a baby on Bubba's doorstep. The mother, Bubba's distant cousin, is murdered by the alleged (and engaged) father of her baby.
47	17	"Home Is Where the Heart Is"	Leo Penn	Story by : Carroll O'Connor; Teleplay by : Edward DeBlasio & Mark Rodgers	March 6, 1990	9822	25.3
Traveling madam Maybelle Cheseboro (Diane Ladd) returns to Sparta with her girls ("nieces") and sets up shop out of Gillespie's jurisdiction. Her return is not without controversy, and soon one of her most vocal critics, a local fundamentalist pastor, is found dead and his wife is murdered afterwards.
48	18	"An Angry Woman"	Winrich Kolbe	Carroll O'Connor	March 13, 1990	9809	25.8
First the mother, then the father of two young children are murdered. Althea takes responsibility for the children, since the mother was a cafeteria worker at Sparta High School. The killings appear to be related to a shady trucking firm.
49	19	"Indiscretions"	Vince Edwards	Story by : Nancy Bond; Teleplay by : William Royce & Cynthia Deming	March 20, 1990	9811	24.5
Althea does not realize that an old girlfriend visiting from Philadelphia is hiding a dark secret, nor does Sweet, who has fallen in love with the woman.
50	20	"Night of the Killing"	Chuck Bowman	Mark Rodgers	March 27, 1990	9819	23.5
Racial tensions run high when white cabbie Mike Cystak is murdered and robbed in The Bottoms.
51	21	"Citizen Trundel: Part 1"	Leo Penn	Carroll O'Connor	May 1, 1990	9813	21.2
Harriet's sister Natalie is murdered on the orders of V.J. Trundel, a rich, white business magnate who has a wife - and a secret love child with Natalie named Eric.
52	22	"Citizen Trundel: Part 2"	Harry Harris	Cynthia Deming & William Royce	May 8, 1990	9824	20.5
Harriet's efforts to bring V.J. Trundel to trial are fruitless. The Chief does not believe they will ever get enough evidence to get an indictment, so he tries another method to bring Trundel to justice.

=== Season 4 (1990–91) ===
No. overall	No. in season	Title	Directed by	Written by	Original release date	Prod. code	Viewers (millions)
53	1	"Brotherly Love: Parts 1 & 2"	Harry Harris	William Royce (part 1)	September 18, 1990	3805A	23.8
54	2	"Brotherly Love: Parts 1 & 2"	Harry Harris	Cynthia Deming (part 2)	September 18, 1990	3805B	23.8
Virgil returns to Philadelphia to investigate a friend's death which turns out to be a murder instead of suicide. Bubba (reluctantly) fills in as Althea's Lamaze coach. Virgil is framed for murder and Gillespie travels to Philly to help him clear his name.
55	3	"Lessons Learned"	Mario Azzopardi	Cynthia Deming	September 25, 1990	3802	21.6
Gillespie sends Parker to confirm suspicions that a local truck stop is really a front for a prostitution business. When a young prostitute is found dead, Gillespie is shocked at her father's reaction. Parker is dismayed when he recognizes one of the ladies.
56	4	"Perversions of Justice"	Harry Harris	Robert Bielak	October 2, 1990	3810	21.7
A mild-mannered science teacher (Pruitt Taylor Vince) is accused of molesting one of his students.
57	5	"And Justice for Some"	Harry Harris	Story by : William Royce & Michael Thurman; Teleplay by : William Royce	October 23, 1990	3803	24.6
Gillespie and his officers are outraged when a drug courier (William Shockley) who ran down the son of Virgil's next-door neighbor makes a deal with the FBI to avoid prosecution.
58	6	"Heart of Gold"	Russ Mayberry	Mitchell Schneider	October 30, 1990	3815	23.6
Bubba is reunited with his high school sweetheart, but his happiness is short lived after she resorts to murder to silence an attorney who was threatening to prevent her from inheriting her late husband's estate.
59	7	"Quick Fix"	Winrich Kolbe	Julie Friedgen	November 6, 1990	3809	21.5
The investigation into the death of an abandoned infant leads to a mentally handicapped teenager.
60	8	"Homecoming"	Russ Mayberry	Robert Bielak	November 13, 1990	3817	23.8
A lawyer has personal reasons for trying to gain early release for a man who was sent to prison after an accident that he caused while drinking and driving.
61	9	"A Problem Too Personal"	Winrich Kolbe	Carroll O'Connor	November 20, 1990	3819	22.5
Harriet and Eugene are devastated after Eugene's father is arrested for murder, and Gillespie appears apathetic in the prosecution of the man as well.
62	10	"A Final Arrangement"	Leo Penn	David Hamilton & Peter Telep	November 27, 1990	3814	23.8
Sweet is heartbroken when a senior citizen who befriended him is murdered in her bookstore and her husband (William Schallert) becomes the prime suspect.
63	11	"Family Matters"	Vincent McEveety	Mitchell Schneider	December 4, 1990	3812	23.2
Virgil works hard to mend the tenuous relationship between himself and his estranged aunt, Ruda Gibson (Fran Bennett), as well as the relationship between Aunt Ruda and her sister, Etta Kibbey (Tonea Stewart). However, when Aunt Ruda's son Tyrell takes part in a string of burglaries, one of which results in the murder of a night-shift janitor, Virgil and Aunt Ruda's relationship is put into further jeopardy.
64	12	"Bounty Hunter"	Russ Mayberry	Cynthia Deming & William Royce	December 11, 1990	3818	25.7
Gillespie receives word that a former Spartan is wanted for the murder of a socialite in Houston. But a ruthless bounty hunter, sent by the victim's jealous husband, is already in Sparta and sees the man's sister as a means to locate his quarry.
65	13	"Blessings"	David Soul	Walton Dornisch	December 18, 1990	3826	20.7
In this Christmas episode, the officers share memories with a reporter from the Sparta Herald.
66	14	"Shine on Sparta Moon"	Leo Penn	Robert Bielak	January 8, 1991	3822	24.5
A bottle of spiked moonshine leads to a car accident that claims the life of a teenage girl and blinds her football-star boyfriend.
67	15	"An Execution of Trust"	Leo Penn	Mitchell Schneider	January 15, 1991	3823	24.2
A therapist tells Gillespie that one of her patients has confessed to a crime that another man is about to be executed for, but she refuses to divulge his identity.
68	16	"Child of Promise"	Vincent McEveety	Cynthia Deming	February 5, 1991	3820	22.6
A story of two brothers as they struggle to influence their younger brother: one (Shaun Baker) is an honor student that Althea has great plans for, and the other is a dangerous drug dealer.
69	17	"Paper Castles"	Vincent McEveety	Story by : Arthur Bernard Lewis; Teleplay by : Joe Gannon	February 12, 1991	3801	22.7
Tommy Spiers (Kenny Leon), an old friend of Virgil's, gets cheated out of his entire life savings after investing it all in a crooked local mall development project. When he goes to demand his money back from the real estate promoters behind the alleged project, they shoot and kill him under the claim of self-defense. Virgil must set out to prove that Tommy was indeed murdered, even though the promoters' alibi appears to be airtight.
70	18	"Laid to Waste"	Vincent McEveety	William Royce & Cynthia Deming	February 19, 1991	3824	21.7
Parker protects a blind woman who heard her neighbor's murder and the body is unable to be located.
71	19	"First Deadly Sin"	Peter Salim	Julie Friedgen	February 26, 1991	3821	19.8
Althea's coworker, English teacher Marcella Allen, is the latest victim of a serial rapist who preys on young, single blonde women living alone. One of Marcella's students, Boyd Gardner (Bryan Dattilo), a prospective seminarian who Marcella tutors in her spare time, is the sole witness to her attack, but his attorney father Elliott warns him not to tell the police what he saw for fear that his chances of being accepted into the seminary will be damaged if he comes forward.
72	20	"Just a Country Boy"	Carroll O'Connor	Carroll O'Connor	March 19, 1991	3811	25.1
Bubba travels to Los Angeles to arrest an arsonist. When the man is murdered to keep him from talking, Bubba teams up with a pretty insurance investigator to solve the crime. Concludes on Season 5's " Unfinished Business".
73	21	"No Other Road"	Paul Chavez	Carroll O'Connor	March 26, 1991	3824	22.0
Virgil and Lonnie try to keep Eugene from giving up on everything when his father goes on trial and faces execution. Harriet tries to remain neutral, but Eugene insists that she be supportive. Meanwhile, the Sparta police search for three suspects in connection to a robbery/murder.
74	22	"A Turning"	Paul Chavez	Carroll O'Connor & Joe Gannon	April 30, 1991	3827	20.2
Althea thinks Virgil needs a new line of work after seeing the aftermath of a shooting at a roadhouse, resulting in the murders of two suspects after a botched drug deal goes sour. Virgil finds himself in danger when the police initiate a setup to catch the killer.

=== Season 5 (1991–92) ===
No. overall	No. in season	Title	Directed by	Written by	Original release date	Prod. code	Viewers (millions)
75	1	"A Woman Much Admired"	Harry Harris	Carroll O'Connor	October 1, 1991	4803	21.3
Gillespie's old flame returns to Sparta to settle some business matters and see Bill. When she is murdered he travels to Gulfport and meets his daughter Lana for the first time.
76	2	"Baby for Sale"	Harry Harris	Story by : Terry Irwin; Teleplay by : Mitchell Schneider	October 8, 1991	4809	20.8
After Bubba's cousin adopts a baby her husband is blackmailed by the child's real parents to help them steal the payroll where he works.
77	3	"Obsession"	Russ Mayberry	Mitchell Schneider	October 22, 1991	4814	17.1
A flirtatious schoolteacher is stalked by a madman.
78	4	"Liar's Poker"	Harry Harris	Mitchell Schneider	October 29, 1991	4801	20.1
A game of high-stakes poker ends in murder.
79	5	"Ruda's Awakening"	Russ Mayberry	Story by : Bill Taub; Teleplay by : Bill Taub & Carroll O'Connor	November 5, 1991	4807	19.7
Virgil's estranged Aunt Ruda is the only witness to a struggle between Bubba and a young robbery suspect that ends in the young man's death. But her prejudice against the police – and Virgil – clouds her memory of the incident.
80	6	"Unfinished Business"	Leo Penn	Joe Gannon	November 12, 1991	4802	17.6
Conclusion of "Just a Country Boy". Bubba returns to Los Angeles to testify at a murder trial and is reunited with Pat Day as they try to protect Mike from killers sent to prevent him from testifying.
81	7	"The More Things Change"	Russ Mayberry	Cynthia Deming & William J. Royce	November 19, 1991	4816	17.4
A man murders his business partner and frames the man's illegitimate daughter for the crime in an attempt to gain the man's business and his wife.
82	8	"Sweet, Sweet Blues"	Vincent McEveety	William J. Royce	November 26, 1991	4821	19.5
The lyrics to a blues song recall a murder that happened 40+ years earlier. The victim: Sweet's grandfather. And the only people left with the answers are the bluesman who wrote the song and a retired sheriff.
83	9	"Sparta Gold"	Winrich Kolbe	Story by : Bill Taub; Teleplay by : Bill Taub and Joe Gannon & Cynthia Deming & William J. Royce	December 3, 1991	4819	19.4
A deputy provides protection for a cotton grower who is running a pot growing operation. But the deputy makes a big mistake when he wounds Bubba's girlfriend.
84	10	"An Eye for an Eye"	Leo Penn	Cynthia Deming	December 10, 1991	4813	20.4
The father of a man DA Darnelle prosecuted kidnaps Darnelle's daughter.
85	11	"The Littlest Victim"	Paul Chavez	Gail Liberti-Kennedy	December 17, 1991	4817	21.0
Lonnie makes a heartbreaking discovery about a woman he dated in high school.
86	12	"The Landlord"	Larry Hagman	Carroll O'Connor	January 7, 1992	4818	21.4
A drug-dealing slumlord is murdered by his accomplices. The first of seven episodes of the series to be directed by Larry Hagman.
87	13	"Fool For Love"	Vincent McEveety	Cynthia Deming & William J. Royce	January 14, 1992	4805	20.2
A doctor plots to eliminate both his wife and his mistress.
88	14	"Love, Honor and Obey"	Reza Badiyi	Cynthia Deming & William J. Royce	February 4, 1992	4823	21.6
Parkers investigation into a purse-snatching reveals an abused woman.
89	15	"Odessa"	Vincent McEveety	Denise Nicholas	February 11, 1992	4822	20.1
Racists target a ceremony honoring a civil rights pioneer. The first of six episodes to be written by Denise Nicholas.
90	16	"A Time to Trust"	Winrich Kolbe	Patt Shea	February 18, 1992	4808	22.2
Althea fears for one of her students after her mother's boyfriend is linked to a drug dealing operation that has resulted in the deaths of several truckers.
91	17	"By Means Most Foul"	Russ Mayberry	Joe Gannon	February 25, 1992	4825	22.3
A restaurateur and her mechanic boyfriend plot to eliminate her husband, but their scheme backfires. Gillespie takes heat over a string of mailbox bashings. And Virgil soon regrets ignoring Parker's theory regarding where the vandals would strike next.
92	18	"Trundel's Will Be Done"	Harry Harris	Cynthia Deming & William J. Royce	March 3, 1992	4826	19.6
V.J. Trundel's widow takes Harriet to court to gain custody of Eric. But Harriet is determined that her nephew will not be raised in the home of the man who had her sister Natalie murdered.
93	19	"Moseley's Lot"	Winrich Kolbe	Joe Gannon	March 31, 1992	4815	18.3
Gillespie learns that the son of an old friend is a compulsive gambler. The young man wants his father to pay off his losses. But when two gangsters show up from New Orleans to collect, his jealous sibling sees the perfect opportunity to get rid of his troubled brother.
94	20	"Family Reunion"	Harry Harris	William J. Royce	April 7, 1992	4812	18.8
An ex-convict attempts to retrieve his loot from his wife and her new husband in this tongue-in-cheek episode.
95	21	"Sanctuary"	Mario Azzopardi	Mitchell Schneider	May 12, 1992	4820	14.0
A political prisoner who entered the country illegally, seeks sanctuary in a monastery. Gillespie and Tibbs find themselves at odds with Sheriff McComb when they try to help the man.
96	22	"The Law on Trial"	Russ Mayberry	Mitchell Schneider	May 19, 1992	4824	15.9
Follow up to "Sanctuary". Gillespie, Tibbs and Father DiMarco must stand trial for harboring a fugitive and obstructing justice. Althea fears Virgil's career could suffer if he is found guilty. Meanwhile the other officers monitor the situation with Lawyer Epp and his mafia associates. The final Heat episode to air on NBC.

=== Season 6 (1992–93) ===
No. overall	No. in season	Title	Directed by	Written by	Original release date	Prod. code	Viewers (millions)
97	1	"A Small War: Part 1"	Harry Harris	Joe Gannon	October 28, 1992	5802	20.0
Big city crack dealers invade Sparta. Eugene witnesses the drive-by shooting of a friend and his offer to help the police identify the shooters leaves Harriet frightened and angry at Bill. The first Heat episode to air on CBS.
98	2	"A Small War: Part 2"	Harry Harris	Joe Gannon	November 4, 1992	5803	19.1
The police wage war against the big city drug dealers who have moved into Sparta. Eugene identifies the men who murdered his friend. And Bubba is teamed with and intrigued by a lady police lieutenant from Jackson.
99	3	"Brother's Keeper"	Winrich Kolbe	William J. Royce	November 11, 1992	5809	19.0
Luann's ne'er-do-well brother (Meshach Taylor) returns home after being paroled.
100	4	"A Frenzied Affair: Part 1"	Winrich Kolbe	Mitchell Schneider	November 18, 1992	5814	18.6
Althea places herself in harm's way trying to help one of her students, a disturbed and violent young man, after he is implicated in a murder case. This storyline continues in the following episode.
101	5	"Discovery: Part 2"	Paul Chavez	Story by : Carroll O'Connor; Teleplay by : Mitchell Schneider	November 18, 1992	5817	18.6
Conclusion of "A Frenzied Affair". Althea has trouble dealing with the violent death of a student. Young Megan Fowler quickly finds herself yet another dangerous boyfriend and they are soon wanted by the police.
102	6	"Random's Child"	Leo Penn	Carroll O'Connor	November 25, 1992	5812	18.7
Lana Farren comes to Sparta to claim her inheritance, but is stalked by a mobster who dated her mother. Meanwhile, Harriet encourages Bill to talk to his daughter, but Lana doesn't seem to be interested. Officer Randy Goode helps keep the bad guys at bay by playing them a little tune on the guitar.
103	7	"An Occupational Hazard"	Vincent McEveety	Cynthia Deming	December 2, 1992	5806	17.8
A secretary takes drastic measures to protect herself from sexual harassment.
104	8	"Last Rights"	Vincent McEveety	Mitchell Schneider	December 9, 1992	5801	15.9
Virgil fears for his Aunt Ruda's safety after several killings occur in the hospital where she is being treated.
105	9	"When the Music Stopped"	Russ Mayberry	Story by : Stephen Schneck; Teleplay by : Stephen Schneck & Carroll O'Connor	December 16, 1992	5808	19.2
Singer Eddie Larran (Robert Goulet) returns to Sparta for a concert, but not everyone is a fan. An angry man insists that Eddie owes him money, and their dispute soon ends in violence. Gary Crosby appears as Larran's manager.
106	10	"Flowers from a Lady"	Russ Mayberry	Denise Nicholas	January 6, 1993	5810	20.3
A city councilwoman becomes dangerously obsessed with Bubba.
107	11	"Private Sessions"	Russ Mayberry	Cynthia Deming	January 13, 1993	5813	19.8
One of Virgil's classmates from law school (Jason Beghe) is arrested following the death of his former girlfriend, but the man insists that her death was the result of her relationship with her psychiatrist (John Vernon).
108	12	"Judgment Day"	Larry Hagman	Mitchell Schneider	January 20, 1993	5818	17.2
A judge schemes to get rid of his wife after she tries to blackmail him into giving her a divorce and a generous settlement by revealing a secret from his past.
109	13	"Falsely Accused"	Reza Badiyi	Joe Gannon	February 3, 1993	5820	17.1
Sweet is the target of false accusations by two corrupt and racist car salesmen.
110	14	"A Step Removed"	Paul Chavez	Mitchell Schneider	February 10, 1993	5824	15.0
Parker's stepfather Roy (Pat Hingle) threatens his former employer after an altercation. When the boss is murdered, Roy is arrested. Concludes in Season 7' Poor Relations.
111	15	"A Deadly Affection"	Vincent McEveety	Joe Gannon	February 17, 1993	5825	16.9
A woman asks Harriet to help her get an eviction order rescinded. The chief gives Parker a new radar gun - and soon comes to regret it. Sheriff McComb requests that Gillespie and Bubba help investigate a murder. Meanwhile Lonnie and Luann search for the boy who reported the murder.
112	16	"The Leftover Man: Parts 1 & 2"	Larry Hagman	Story by : Gigi Levangie & Mack Anderson; Teleplay by : Carroll O'Connor	March 3, 1993	5804	18.4
113	17	"The Leftover Man: Parts 1 & 2"	Larry Hagman	Story by : Gigi Levangie & Mack Anderson; Teleplay by : Carroll O'Connor	March 3, 1993	5805	18.4
A white supremacist politician plans to have his wife's lover murdered and blame it on black radicals.
114	18	"A Dish Best Served Cold"	Reza Badiyi	Cynthia Deming & William J. Royce	March 17, 1993	5823	18.3
A swindlers homecoming upsets his wife and the families of his victims - especially Etta.
115	19	"Legacy"	Paul Chavez	Denise Nicholas	March 24, 1993	5821	17.9
A wealthy man plans to grant a promise made to a black sharecropper many years ago by giving land to the man's descendant. But his greedy son disapproves.
116	20	"Even Nice People: Part 1"	Carroll O'Connor	Carroll O'Connor	April 28, 1993	5822	13.6
Corrupt developers set their sights on Lana's farm. When she refuses to sell they enlist the services of an arsonist to force her out. Concludes on Lake Winahatchie.
117	21	"Lake Winahatchie: Part 2"	Harry Harris	Cynthia Deming	May 5, 1993	5819	15.1
Conclusion of "Even Nice People". Bill discovers the motivation behind a crime syndicates attempt to muscle in on Sparta and the reason they are determined to get Lana's land.
118	22	"A Correct Settling"	Harry Harris	Carroll O'Connor	May 12, 1993	5826	15.3
Eugene hopes a well known minister can save his father from death row. But someone runs the reverend off the road on his way into town and the Sparta police try to protect him and track down his assailant. Meanwhile, Harriet struggles with what her part in her ex-husband's appeal should be and is even more unsettled when Eugene demands that she break up with Bill.

=== Season 7 (1993–94) ===
No. overall	No. in season	Title	Directed by	Written by	Original release date	Prod. code	Viewers (millions)
119	1	"Child's Play"	Harry Harris	Mitchell Schneider	September 16, 1993	2806	16.2
Chief Gillespie is fired by the city council and Sparta's new police chief Hampton Forbes arrives in town. Bill's last case with Sparta P.D. is a murder investigation in which a young boy has been implicated.
120	2	"Hatton's Turn: Part 1"	Carroll O'Connor	Carroll O'Connor	September 18, 1993	2809	N/A
Hampton Forbes assumes the office of Chief of Police and Bill becomes the Sheriff of Newton County. Former Spartan Wade Hatton (Stacy Keach) returns to Sparta hoping to make sense of his life and rekindle his relationship with Sarah Hallisey. Bubba and Covey take the new chief on a tour of Sparta and Bill takes Wade to visit some distant cousins. Meanwhile two young criminals involve a mentally handicapped young man in a terrible crime.
121	3	"Hatton's Turn: Part 2"	Carroll O'Connor	Carroll O'Connor	September 18, 1993	2810	N/A
Wade and Sarah try to keep young Henry (Wayne Brady) from being punished for a crime he did not commit and Forbes and his officers search for the two men who are really responsible.
122	4	"A Depraved Heart"	Harry Harris	Cynthia Deming, William J. Royce	September 23, 1993	2805	18.0
The daughter of an old friend of Bubba's asks him to arrest the man who knowingly infected her with AIDS.
123	5	"Incident at Brewer's Pond"	Russ Mayberry	Terry Kay	September 30, 1993	2801	17.2
A night of revelry at a local pond turns deadly.
124	6	"A Love Lost"	Larry Hagman	Joe Gannon	October 14, 1993	2807	12.5
Lana's ex- boyfriend comes to see her and brings a load of stolen rifles with him.
125	7	"Singin' the Blues"	Gail Liberti-Kennedy	Cynthia Deming	October 28, 1993	2813	15.2
Luann moonlights as a singer at a nightclub and finds romance with the club's owner. Her happiness is short-lived when she realizes that the bartender is dealing drugs.
126	8	"Virgil Tibbs: Attorney at Law"	Charles Mills	Mitchell Schneider	November 4, 1993	2812	18.0
Attorney Virgil Tibbs returns to Sparta and is soon assigned his first case as a defense attorney.
127	9	"Every Man's Family"	Harry Harris	Cynthia Deming, William J. Royce	November 10, 1993	2815	13.1
Bubba travels to Atlanta to help his nephew after the boy overdoses on drugs. He soon teams up with a street wise cop to take down the drug ring. Based on Hugh O'Connor's real-life struggle with drug addiction.
128	10	"A Baby Called Rocket"	Paul Chavez	Gina Barnett	November 25, 1993	2814	13.7
A neglected baby stirs maternal feelings in Luann.
129	11	"Little Girl Lost"	Larry Hagman	Denise Nicholas	December 9, 1993	2819	15.4
Tragic story of an alcoholic teenager who accidentally kills a little girl while she is drinking and driving.
130	12	"Your Own Kind"	Dick Martin	Denise Nicholas	December 16, 1993	2808	14.6
Gillespie and Forbes investigate the attempted shooting of an interracial high school couple. Meanwhile, Harriet holds a fundraiser to raise money for pregnant teenagers at her art studio.
131	13	"Good Cop, Bad Cop"	Winrich Kolbe	Cynthia Deming	January 6, 1994	2823	17.4
Virgil defends Parker after he is falsely accused of police brutality by a drug dealer. The prosecution's main witness: the man's girlfriend (Victoria Jackson), who was once engaged to Parker.
132	14	"Maybelle Returns"	Russ Mayberry	Joe Gannon	January 12, 1994	2811	13.5
Former traveling madam Maybelle Cheseboro (Elizabeth Ashley) returns to Sparta and sets up her own phone sex business, which is a great success - until one of her girls decides to moonlight as a prostitute and dies while with a client.
133	15	"The Last Round"	Reza Badiyi	Mitchell Schneider	January 19, 1994	2817	15.0
Forbes is delighted when his fiancée Angela comes to see him, but is disappointed when he realizes that they have very different plans for the future.
134	16	"Ches and the Grand Lady"	Vincent McEveety	Carroll O'Connor	January 26, 1994	2818	13.8
Follow up to "Sweet, Sweet Blues". Lonnie must protect his Aunt Cordelia when her cherished friendship with Ches Collins angers one of his cousins.
135	17	"Conspiracy of One"	Joe Gannon	Joe Gannon	February 2, 1994	2820	12.6
Virgil accepts a position at a prominent law firm. But as a former police officer he feels conflicting emotions when he realizes that one of their clients is guilty of murder.
136	18	"The Rabbi"	Winrich Kolbe	David O'Connor, Elyse O'Connor	February 9, 1994	2816	14.9
A rabbi (Jerry Stiller) returns to Sparta after many years. Racists vandalize his synagogue and soon after their Torah is stolen. Forbes investigates but the rabbi refuses to trust Bill because of his inaction while investigating a hate crime many years ago.
137	19	"Hard Choices"	Russ Mayberry	Gina Barnett	March 9, 1994	2802	12.2
Eugene tries to protect a friend who was an unwilling accomplice to a robbery and in doing so endangers his probation – and his life.
138	20	"Time's Long Shadow"	Paul Chavez	David O'Connor, Elyse O'Connor	March 16, 1994	2803	11.8
Harriet tries to stop an arrogant developer from destroying an important archeological site.
139	21	"Poor Relations"	Reza Badiyi	Denise Nicholas, Carroll O'Connor	March 30, 1994	2822	13.5
Follow up to "A Step Removed". Comedic episode in which Parker's ne'er-do-well stepfather (Pat Hingle) returns to Sparta with a new wife, a stolen painting and two inept art thieves who are determined to steal the painting back.
140	22	"Dangerous Engagement"	Vincent McEveety	Mitchell Schneider	May 4, 1994	2821	15.1
Bill and Harriet's wedding plans are interrupted by a sniper who mistakes Bill for Sheriff McComb.
141	23	"Give Me Your Life: Part 1"	Russ Mayberry	Story by : Carroll O'Connor; Teleplay by : Cynthia Deming, William J. Royce	May 11, 1994	2824A	14.6
Part 1 of a two-part series finale. Bill and Harriet travel to New Orleans for their honeymoon. Forbes learns that a cult which has rented an old school building may be involved in child abuse and other illegal activities. While inspecting the premises Bubba and Dee rescue a frightened young girl. Bubba finds a foster home for the girl but the girl's mother tries to regain custody in court - with Sarah Hallisey as their attorney.
142	24	"Give Me Your Life: Part 2"	Russ Mayberry	Story by : Carroll O'Connor; Teleplay by : Cynthia Deming, William J. Royce	May 11, 1994	2824B	14.6
Part 2 of a two-part series finale. Bill and Harriet return home. The cult kidnaps the girl from her foster home. And Forbes and his men arrest a man who has been supplying drugs used to keep the cult members under control. Soon a standoff develops and the officers realize that they have no intention of surrendering. Sarah is taken hostage. As they attempt to rescue the women and children Lonnie and Parker find themselves defusing a bomb and Bubba risks his life to rescue a small child from the building.

=== TV films (1994–95) ===
Title	Directed by	Written by	Original release date	Viewers (millions)
A Matter of Justice	Reza Badiyi	Mitchell Schneider,	October 21, 1994	16.7
The daughter of a close friend of Forbes is murdered and the officers must prove that the deranged grandson (Josh Lucas) of a retired judge (George C. Scott) is guilty.
Who Was Geli Bendl?	Larry Hagman	Carroll O'Connor	December 9, 1994	14.8
A famous Italian actress returns to Sparta to take care of some unfinished business and rescue her younger sister from a life of drugs and poverty.
By Duty Bound	Harry Harris	Joe Gannon	February 17, 1995	15.1
Acting Sheriff Gillespie must decide whether he should run for sheriff or retire from law enforcement. It soon becomes apparent that the other candidate is corrupt and dangerous.
Grow Old Along With Me	Winrich Kolbe	Cynthia Deming	May 16, 1995	15.0
Ex-cop John Ryan's happiness with his new bride is threatened by an old flame who sees an opportunity for blackmail.
