= Al-Zayani =

Surname disambiguation page

Al-Zayani (Arabic: الزياني) is a surname. Notable people with the surname include:

- Abdullatif bin Rashid Al Zayani, Bahraini engineer and Secretary-General of the Gulf Cooperation Council
- Afnan Al Zayani, Bahraini chef
- Khalil Al-Zayani, Saudi Arabian footballer and football coach
- Mona Al-Zayani, Bahraini educator and politician
