= Buttergate =

2021 Canadian food scandal

Buttergate was a 2021 event in which Canadian butter became more difficult to spread due to increased hardness. Canadian consumers expressed disappointment that butter stopped becoming soft at room temperature. Food experts attributed the hardness to an increased use of palm oil in dairy cattle diet, prompting the Dairy Farmers of Canada to recommend to farmers to cease adding palm oil to cow's diets.

== Butter manufacturing ==
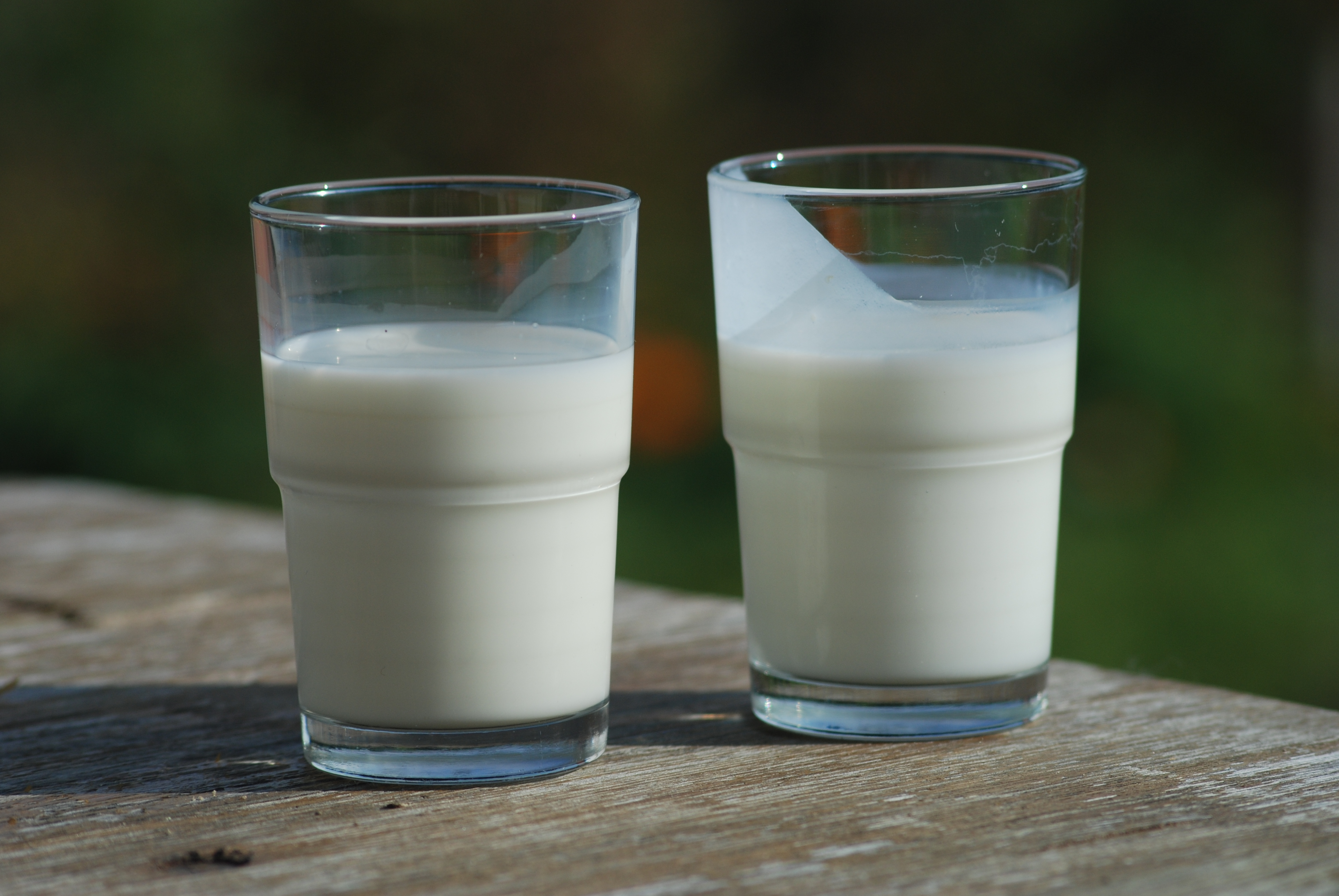
Milk (left), and Buttermilk (right)

Butter consistency is influenced by both the balance of ingredients added to milk fat, and the diet of the dairy cattle that produce the milk fat.

=== Butter ingredients ===
The primary ingredient in butter is milk fat, although butter also contains saturated fats which are solid at room temperature and mono- and polyunsaturated fats which are liquid at room temperature. Butter hardness is a result of the percentage mix of those ingredients. While European butter rules mandate fat content typically in the 82% to 85% range, Canadian regulations require 80% of butter to be milk fat.

=== Milk-fat production ===
Canadian recipe writer Julie Van Rosendaal subsequently suggested that dairy farmers may have increased their use of palm oil in dairy cattle's diet, increasing the hardness of the milk fat they produced. Palm oil contains palmitic acid, has a melting point of 63 °C (145 °F), and increases the hardness of butter.

== Timeline ==
Francis Halin from the Le Journal de Montreal reported on butter softness in February 2021, the same month Twitter users replied to a tweet by Van Rosendaal in which she asked about other people's experience of butter not softening at room temperature. Within a week of Rosendaal's follow-up article in the CBC, the surrounding scandal was labelled Buttergate.

== Causes ==
Van Rosendaal blamed the hardening on both an increase in home baking during the COVID-19 pandemic lockdowns, and an increased use of palm oil. Retail butter sales increased 12.4% in 2020, while the number of dairy cows in Canada decreased, with a cull occurring when milk production reduced in response to school closures during the COVID-19 pandemic; schools had previously bought milk for student consumption.

The Dairy Farmers of Canada initially rejected Van Rosendaal's assertions, before switching tactics to what The Economist called "grovelling," making two statements in February 2021:

There are many different factors that can have subtle impacts on the taste, texture and the melting point of butter, including differences in a cow's diet from one region to another or from one season to the next

Exact cow feed rations are determined at the farm level in consultation with animal nutrition experts and may impact the complexity of butter in various ways.

Recent studies published in academic journals suggest that a strong correlation between palmitic acid and butter firmness existed, disputing the Dairy Farmers of Canada's claim that nothing was wrong.

Sylvain Charlebois, of the Agri-food Analytics Lab at Dalhousie University noted that consumers initially blamed colder weather but opined that the most likely cause was an increase of palm oil in cow diet.

== Impact ==
In response to Buttergate, Dairy Farmers of Canada and The Quebec Milk Producers Association recommended that dairy farmers stop feeding palm oil to dairy cattle. Quebec-based dairy cooperative Agropur, welcomed The Quebec Milk Producers Association's advice. David Christensen, professor emeritus of animal science at the University of Saskatchewan, stated that the directives to not use palm oil will present production challenges for dairy farmers, as there was no equally effective alternative as palm oil for boosting fatty milk production.

The Dairy Farmers of Canada created working group on the use of palm oil produced its final report in January 2022. The working group concluded that butter hardening could not be "solely attributed" to palm oil supplementation. An academic also correlated palmitic acid content in butter with hardness, critiqued the lack of transparency in the Canadian dairy supply, which it linked to an inability to make firm conclusions linking agricultural practises with consumer products.

== See also ==
- List of -gate scandals and controversies
