= Anna Wecker =

German non-fiction writer (1600-1596)

Anna Wecker, née Keller, widowed Aeschenberger (first half 16th century – 1596 in Altdorf near Nuremberg), was a 16th-century poet and cookbook author. She is frequently also referred to as Anna Weckerin.

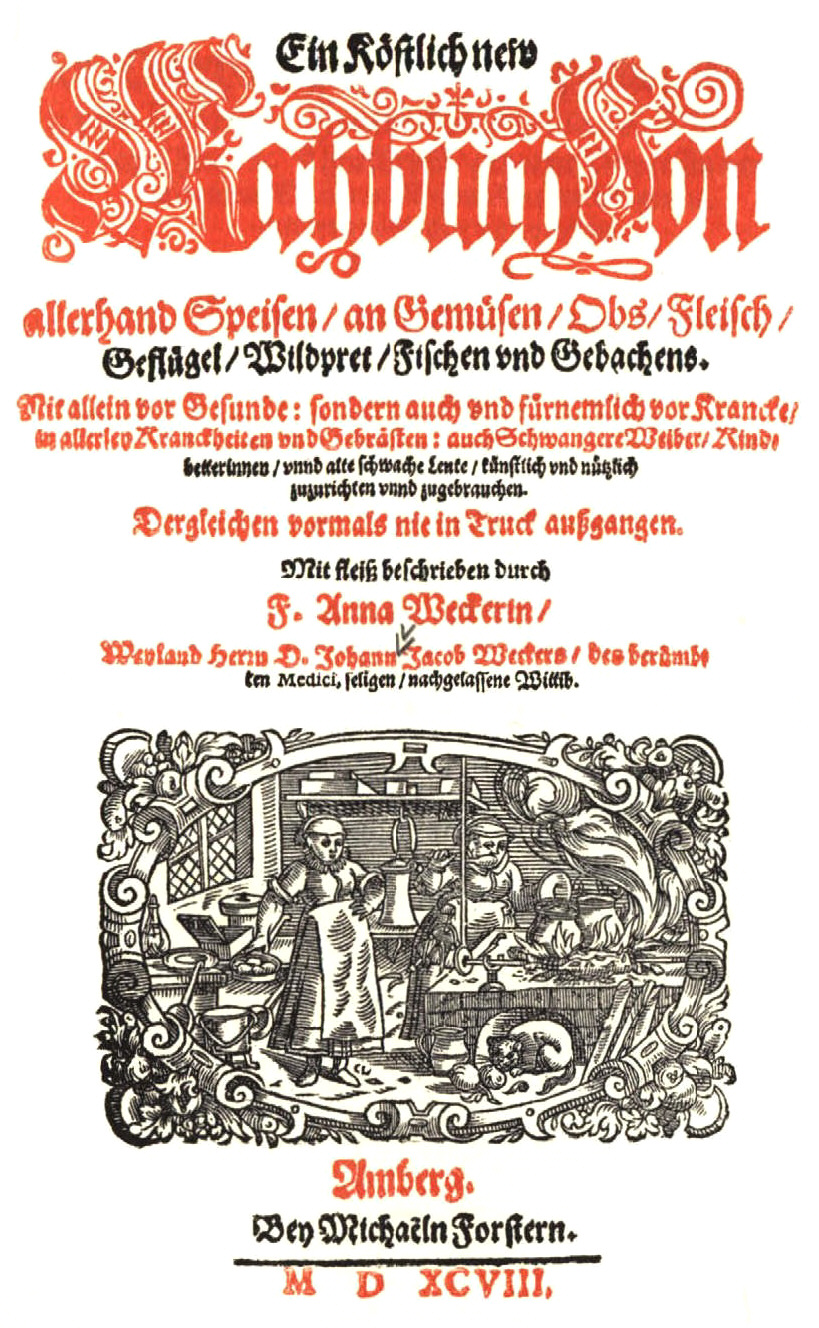
title page of Anna Wecker's cookbook, 1598 edition.

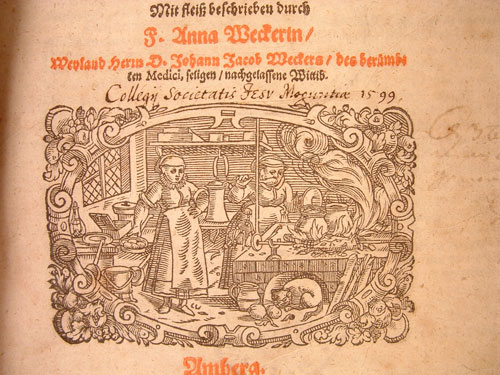
Mainz copy of the cookbook.

== Life ==
Wecker was first married to Israel Aeschenberger, town clerk in Altdorf near Nuremberg. In 1572 their daughter Katharina married the scholar Nicolaus Taurellus. Following the death of her first husband, Wecker married the physician Johann Jakob Wecker (1528–1586) from Basel. He held the position of city physician (Stadtphysikus) in Colmar, where he also died. Two years after his death Wecker published Antidotarium Speciale, ex. opt. authorum … scriptis fideliter congestum et amplius triente actum in Basel. Even earlier, in 1586, she had authored a wedding poem for Jacob Pömer and Barbara Löffelholtz, signing as „Anna Kellerin, Doctor Hannß Jacob Wecker seligen hinderlassene Wittfraw“ (Anna Kellerin, the late doctor Hannß Jacob Wecker's widow).

Following her second husband's death Wecker lived with her daughter in Nuremberg. In the year of her death she finished her main work, the cookbook Ein Köstlich new Kochbuch (a delicious new cookbook), dedicated to Luise Juliana von Oranien-Nassau. It was the first printed cookbook in German authored by a woman. It was published in 1597 by Katharina Taurellus and reprinted numerous times until the end of the 17th century. Together with Philippine Welser (De re coquinaria, 1545) and Sabina Welserin (Das Kochbuch der Sabina Welserin, 1553), Anna Wecker counts amongst the few 16th-century women food writers known by name.

== Works ==
- Ein Hochzeit Spruch / zu Ehren und glücklicher Wolfart. Dem Erbarn und Vesten Junckern / Jacob Pömern / vnd seiner Erbarn und Tugentsamen Braut / Jungfrawen Barbara Löffelholtzin: Gestellet Durch / Anna Kellerin: Doctor Hannß Jacob Wecker seligen hinderlassene Wittfraw (1586) – in possession of Herzog August Bibliothek Wolfenbüttel
- Ein Köstlich new Kochbuch: Von allerhand Speisen / an Gemüsen / Obs / Fleisch / Geflügel / Wildpret / Fischen und Gebachens. Nicht allein vor Gesunde: sondern auch vnd Fürnemblich vor Krancke / in allerley Kranckheiten vnd Gebrästen: auch Schwangere Weiber / Kindbetterinnen / vnd alte schwache Leute / künstlich und nützlich zuzurichten und zu gebrauchen. Dergleichen vormals nie in Truck außgangen. Mit fleiß beschrieben durch F. Anna Weckerin. Weyland Herrn D. Johann Jacob Weckers / des berümbten Medici, seligen / nachgelassene Wittib (1597) – in possession of Herzog August Bibliothek Wolfenbüttel

== Literature ==
- Karl Groos (1894). "Taurellus, Nicolaus". Allgemeine Deutsche Biographie (in German). Vol. 37. Leipzig: Duncker & Humblot. pp. 467–471., p. 468 about Anna Wecker
- Eine weibliche Stimme im poetischen Ehediskurs – Anna Keller. In: Albrecht Classen: Der Liebes- und Ehediskurs vom hohen Mittelalter bis zum frühen 17. Jahrhundert. Waxmann, Münster 2005, p. 294–300.
