= Cajsa Warg =

Swedish cookbook author

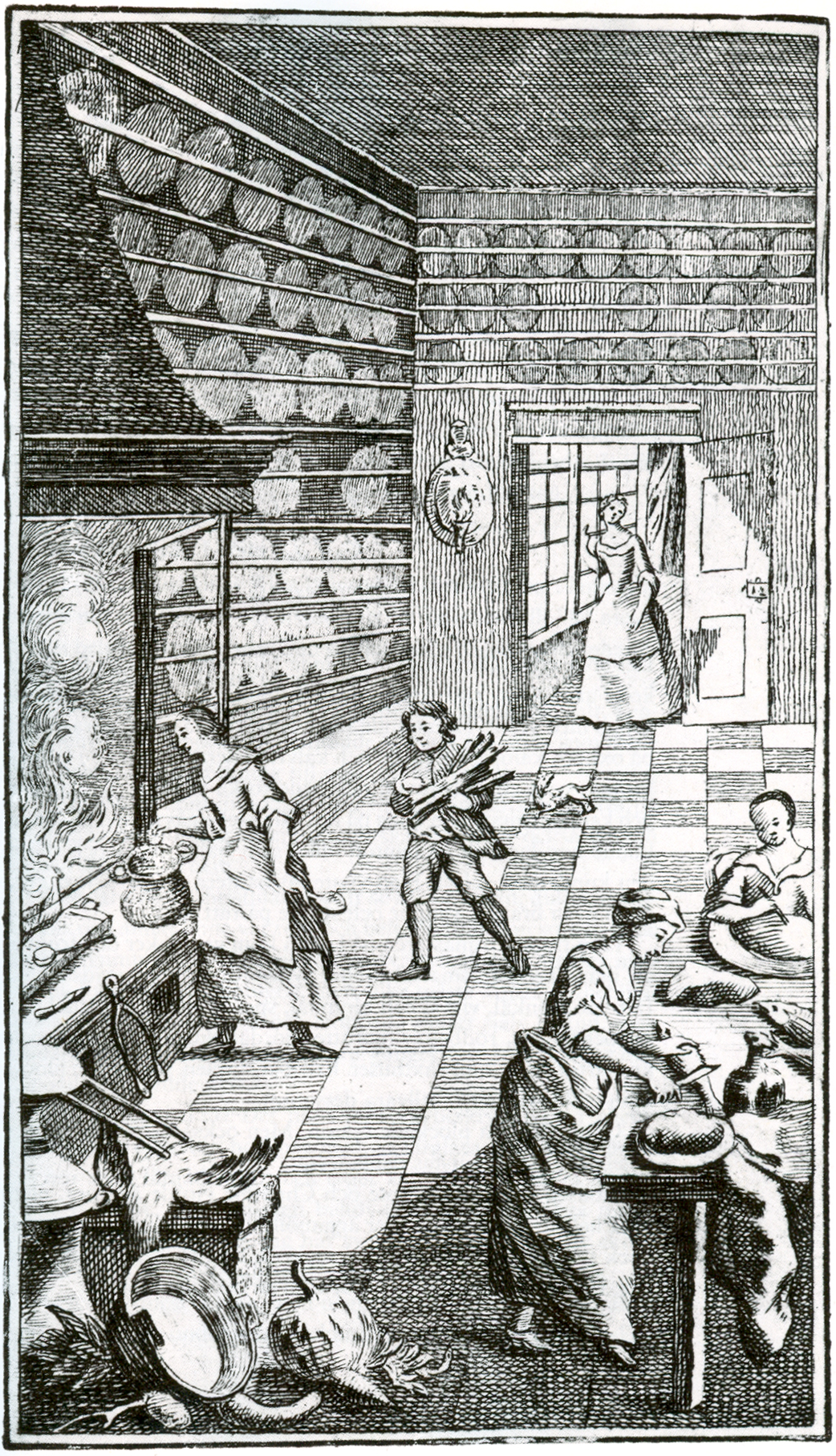
Frontispiece, first edition of Hjelpreda I Hushållningen För Unga Fruentimber (1755)

Anna Christina Warg (23 March 1703 – 5 February 1769), better known as Cajsa (or Kajsa) Warg, was a Swedish cookbook author and one of the best-known cooks in the Swedish culinary history. Born in Örebro in Sweden, she worked as a cook and housekeeper for notable individuals in Stockholm. She is particularly renowned for her famous cookbook titled Hjelpreda i Hushållningen för Unga Fruentimber (Helpful Guide in Housekeeping for Young Women), published in 1755. An essential reference for homemakers in 18th-century Sweden, this book had several editions and was also translated in German, Danish and Estonian.

== Life and career ==
Warg was born in Örebro, the younger of two daughters, to accountant Anders Warg (died 1708) and Karin Livijn (died 1755). In 1710, her mother married the nobleman Eric Rosenstråle, with whom she had seven more children and moved with to Borggård Manor outside Finspång.

For unknown reasons, Warg left home in her youth and moved to the capital of Stockholm, where she chose to work for a number of rich people, such as Wolter Reinholt Stackelberg and Berndt Otto Stackelberg; since her employers were of military background, it is likely that she was given contacts by her stepfather.

From the 1740s, she worked for the nobleman Leonard Klinckowström, whose wife was her mother's cousin. She was formally employed with the title husmamsell, which was the title of the housekeeper, but as such as she supervised the kitchen staff and directed the preparation of food, essentially working as a cook.

When her employer Leonard Klinckowström died in 1759, she retired and supported herself on the income from her popular book and on renting out rooms.

== Cookbook ==
In 1755, Warg inherited 5000 daler from her mother when she died. The same year, she published Hjelpreda I Hushållningen För Unga Fruentimber ("Guide to Housekeeping for Young Women") which was published in fourteen editions of which the last version was printed in 1822. It was also translated into German, which came out in four editions, and one Estonian edition. The book mostly contains food recipes but also includes instructions on dyeing textiles and other things related to household maintenance. From the third edition (1762), it included an appendix with the title Underrättelse om Färgning ("instruction on dyeing"). The appendix on dyeing was translated into Danish with two editions (1773 and 1794).

Warg's work was the leading cookbook for several generations and remained relevant until the late 19th century when new household goods, industrially manufactured kitchen stoves and changes in cuisine made most of its recipes outdated.

=== Editions ===
Swedish

- first edition, 1755 (also published in a facsimile edition in 1970)
- second edition, 1759
- third edition, 1762 (expansion with an appendix on dyeing textiles)
- fourth edition, 1765 (expansion with an appendix with more recipes)
- fifth edition, 1770
- sixth edition, 1773 (from this edition described as "å nyo öfwersedd, förbättrad och tilökt", "again reviewed, improved and expanded")
- seventh edition, 1780
- eighth edition, 1781
- ninth edition, 1790
- tenth edition, 1795
- eleventh edition, 1800
- twelfth edition, 1809
- thirteenth edition, 1814
- fourteenth edition, 1822

German

- Schwedisches Koch- und Haushaltungs-Buch, first edition (1772)
- second edition (1778)
- third edition (1789)
- fourth edition (1805)

Danish (only the appendix on textile dyeing)

- Den paa Kundskab og Erfaring grundede nye Farve-Bog, first edition (1773)
- second edition (1794)

Estonian

- Köki ja Kokka Ramat, mis Rootsi Kelest Eesti-ma Kele üllespandud on (1781)

== See also ==
- List of women cookbook writers
- Anna Maria Rückerschöld
- Hanna Winsnes, Norway's "Cajsa Warg"
- Hannah Glasse, contemporary English cookbook author
- Swedish cuisine
- Early modern European cuisine
