= Clodagh McKenna =

Irish chef and cookbook author

- Born: Blackrock, Cork, Ireland
- Education: Ballymaloe Cookery School & House
- Spouse: The Hon. Harry Herbert (m. 2021)
- Culinary career
- Current restaurants
- Clodagh's Kitchen (in Arnotts and Blackrock)
- Website: clodaghmckenna.com

Clodagh McKenna, the Hon. Mrs Harry Herbert is an Irish chef, author of cookbooks, columnist and television presenter. She has demonstrated cookery on The Rachael Ray Show, ITV's This Morning and hosted several television series and writes a column for the Evening Standard.

== Television ==
In Clodagh's Irish Food Trails, a television series consisting of 13 episodes aimed at the American market, she travelled Ireland to such places as: Skelligs rock, Dingle's sea caves and Fastnet Rock's lighthouse. There, she explored various foods, farmers' markets and met local chefs, fishermen and farmers.

In May 2026, ITV commissioned Clodagh: Cooking At Home; a six-part series that premiered on 10 October 2026.

== Personal life ==
On 1 October 2020, McKenna announced her engagement to Harry Herbert — son of The 7th Earl of Carnarvon; the couple live together at Broadspear House in Highclere Park. Herbert is the CEO of Highclere Thoroughbred Racing.

The couple were married on Saturday 14 August 2021 at the Church of Saint Michaels and All Angels, Highclere, near Highclere Castle, better known as the fictional Downton Abbey and birthplace of the groom.

== Books ==
- The Irish Farmers' Market Cookbook (2009)
- Fresh From the Sea (2009)
- Homemade (2010)
- Clodagh's Kitchen Diaries (2012)
- Clodagh's Irish Kitchen (2015)
- Clodagh's Suppers (2019)
- Clodagh's Weeknight Kitchen (2020)
- A Recipe for Success (2021) (guest contributor)
- In Minutes (28 October 2021)
- Clodagh's Happy Cooking (30 October 2025)
- Clodagh at Home (15 October 2026)

== See also ==
- List of women cookbook writers
