= Luisa Weiss =

Italian-American writer

- Born: 1977 (age 48–49); West Berlin, West Germany
- Occupation: Writer
- Writing career
- Notable works: My Berlin Kitchen (2012); Classic German Baking (2016)
- Website: luisaweiss.com

Luisa Weiss (born 1977) is an Italian-American writer based in Berlin. Weiss was employed as a literary scout and cookbook editor in New York where, in 2005, she started the food blog The Wednesday Chef. She has written two books—the memoir My Berlin Kitchen (2012) and the well-received cookbook Classic German Baking (2016).

== Biography ==
Luisa Weiss was born in West Berlin in 1977. Her Italian mother, Letizia Cosentino Weiss, worked as a translator. Her father, Richard Weiss, was from the United States and taught mathematics. After her parents divorced when she was three years old, she moved to the U.S. with her father and settled in Boston, Massachusetts. Weiss went to school in Brookline and spent her vacations with her mother in Berlin and family in Italy. Weiss returned to Berlin when she was ten years old to receive her middle and high school education. Around this time, she began gathering clippings of recipes to test in the kitchen.

Weiss studied at Tufts University in Massachusetts and spent a year in Paris for graduate school. She then moved to New York, where she would work in the publishing industry for the next decade. Weiss was employed as a literary scout at Bettina Schrewe and later became senior editor at Stewart, Tabori & Chang, a publisher whose acquisitions focused on cookbooks and books on crafts. She started a blog named The Wednesday Chef in 2005 to document her experiences creating all the recipes she had clipped from newspapers over past years, inspired by the work of food bloggers such as Julie Powell, who had documented her experiences cooking all the recipes in a Julia Child cookbook within a year. The title of her blog was inspired by the fact that American newspapers have traditionally published their food columns on Wednesdays. In 2009, Times Online featured The Wednesday Chef on a list of their favourite food blogs.

In 2010, Weiss returned to Berlin to live with her future husband Max Beuchel and write full-time. She published a memoir titled My Berlin Kitchen in 2012 and a cookbook titled Classic German Baking in 2016. She was a columnist for Harper's Bazaar Germany from 2014 to 2017.

== Books ==
=== My Berlin Kitchen (2012) ===
Weiss's memoir, My Berlin Kitchen, was published with Viking Press in 2012. The book covers Weiss's childhood spent with parents who resided in separate countries, her career in the New York publishing industry, and her life since moving to Berlin. At the end of each chapter, the reader is presented with a recipe for a food previously mentioned in the text—German, Italian, and American dishes representing the places Weiss has lived.

Booklist reviewer Allison Block, in a starred review of My Berlin Kitchen, called the book "a heartwarming (and often mouth-watering) memoir" with appeal to both foodies and non-foodies and chapters "brimming with colorful cooking tales and savory recipes." Sue White of Library Journal recommended the book, finding it a "charming" food memoir suited to those who enjoy the works of Laurie Colwin or M.F.K. Fisher. Kirkus Reviews, however, thought the "often-clunky" writing led to "queasy" descriptions of food and "violated the show-don't-tell rule of writing"; criticism was also directed at rudimentary or overly complicated recipes and those with ingredients not accessible to most Americans.

=== Classic German Baking (2016) ===
Classic German Baking was first published in 2016 by Ten Speed Press. The cookbook contains a hundred recipes of traditional baked goods, ranging from butter cookies, to cakes, strudels, tortes, and Christmas cookies, written with consideration to American home kitchens and ingredients. Weiss was motivated to write the book as she felt like there was a deficit of German baking cookbooks in the American market despite the country's large German immigrant population. She described the recipe-gathering process as a two-year effort that involved investigating antique cookbooks, then consulting friends and family, and corroborating her research using the internet.

The Washington Post and The New York Times placed Classic German Baking on their lists of 2016's best cookbooks. Oliver Strand, writing for Vogue, called the book a "gorgeous" introduction to German baking culture, while Los Angeles Times food editor Amy Scattergood credited Weiss for writing a "not only useful and instructive but charming" cookbook. In the New York Journal of Books, reviewer Sharon Kebschull Barrett praised the book's "careful, concise" cooking directions and had only "mild" complaints, including a desire for more explanatory photos, an issue they felt the precision of the directions compensated for.
