= Julie Van Rosendaal =

Canadian food writer

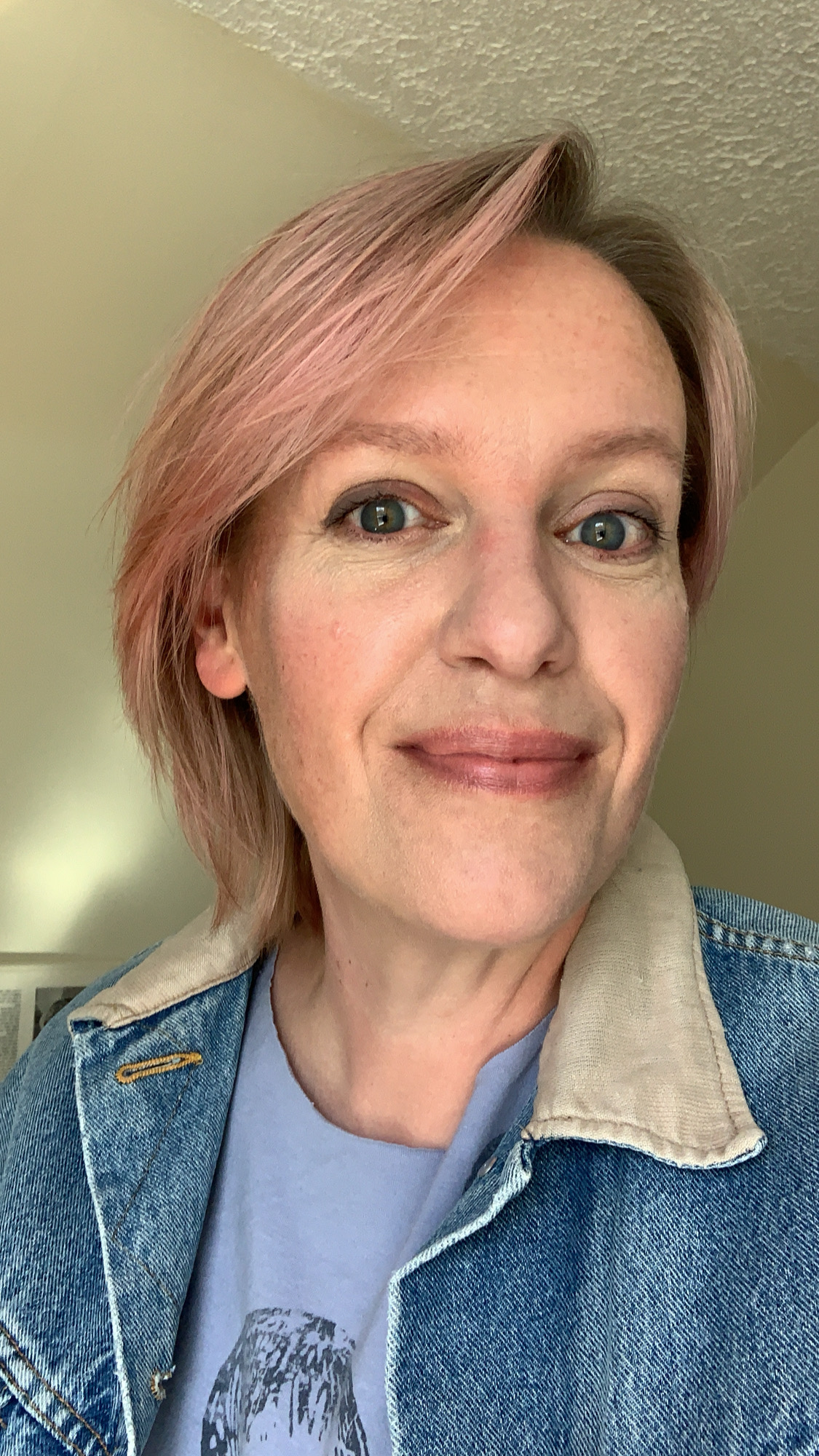
Julie Van Rosendaal in 2021

Julie Van Rosendaal is a Canadian food writer. Her 2021 social media post about increasingly hard butter triggered the Buttergate scandal in Canada.

== Career ==
Van Rosendaal has worked for the Canadian Broadcasting Corporation, Parents Canada magazine, Western Living magazine and co-hosted the It's Just Food television program.

In February 2021, Van Rosendaal drew attention to the increasing hardness of Canadian butter in what became known as Buttergate in a social media post. In 2022, she hosted an online cooking class for 1,000 school students.

She is the author of eight cookbooks, including Dirty Food and Starting Out.

== Personal life ==
Van Rosendaal lives in Calgary, Alberta, with her teenage son.
