= Joe Gannon =

American musician

Joe Gannon was a recording producer, director, and a musical stage lighting and production designer. A Philadelphia native, Gannon's career began as road manager for the Kingston Trio in the band's early days of its greatest success. He later operated and managed Frank Zappa’s record company and produced records for CBS. Gannon also worked as road manager for Bill Cosby and staged Madonna's first film appearance. He toured internationally as a producer, director and lighting designer for such stars as Alice Cooper, Teddy Pendergrass, Luther Vandross, Barry Manilow, Julio Iglesias. Joe Gannon died on January 9, 2024 at age 93.

== The Kingston Trio ==
In the early 1950s after serving the Navy, Gannon attended Menlo College’s School of Business Administration in California. There he met Dave Guard, Nick Reynolds and singer Barbara Bogue (she later became his wife) who together began a singing group called "Dave Guard & the Calypsonians" and later, "The Kingston Quartet". The group performed at college frat parties and were regulars at the Cracked Pot Cafe across the street from campus, Gannon playing stand-up bass. He left the group after graduation in 1956, moving to Minneapolis where he went into business. The Calypsonians regrouped with Guard, Reynolds and Bob Shane becoming known as The Kingston Trio. Gannon returned to California and eventually became the long-time road manager and later business manager for the Trio. In 2000, the Kingston Trio was inducted into the Vocal Group Hall of Fame.

In 1967, Gannon was credited as recording engineer on the Lost Kingston Trio Album, which was recorded in 1966 at the breakup of the group with John Stewart.

== Neil Diamond ==
In 1970, Joe Gannon was one of the first production designers to use moving sets on rock concert tours while he was working with Neil Diamond. Gannon was Diamond's road manager, lighting director, and show consultant in the early 1970s. Gannon's involvement was credited as the reason for the great improvement in Diamond's stage presentations by the time of the legendary 1972 Hot August Night concert series.

== Alice Cooper ==
Expanding upon creative input from Alice Cooper and Shep Gordon, Gannon was responsible for turning Cooper's vision into a tangible, three-dimensional nightmare reality of magic and wonderment. These set designs resulted in some of the most elaborate stage and light presentations of any rock show, setting a new standard in terms of sheer massive size. In 1974, Gannon directed the documentary film, Good To See you Again, Alice Cooper, which was re-released in 2005.

== Personal life ==
His wife, Beverly Gannon, is a prominent chef in Maui, where one of her three restaurants is named after him.
