= Anna Maria Rückerschöld =

Swedish author (1725–1805)

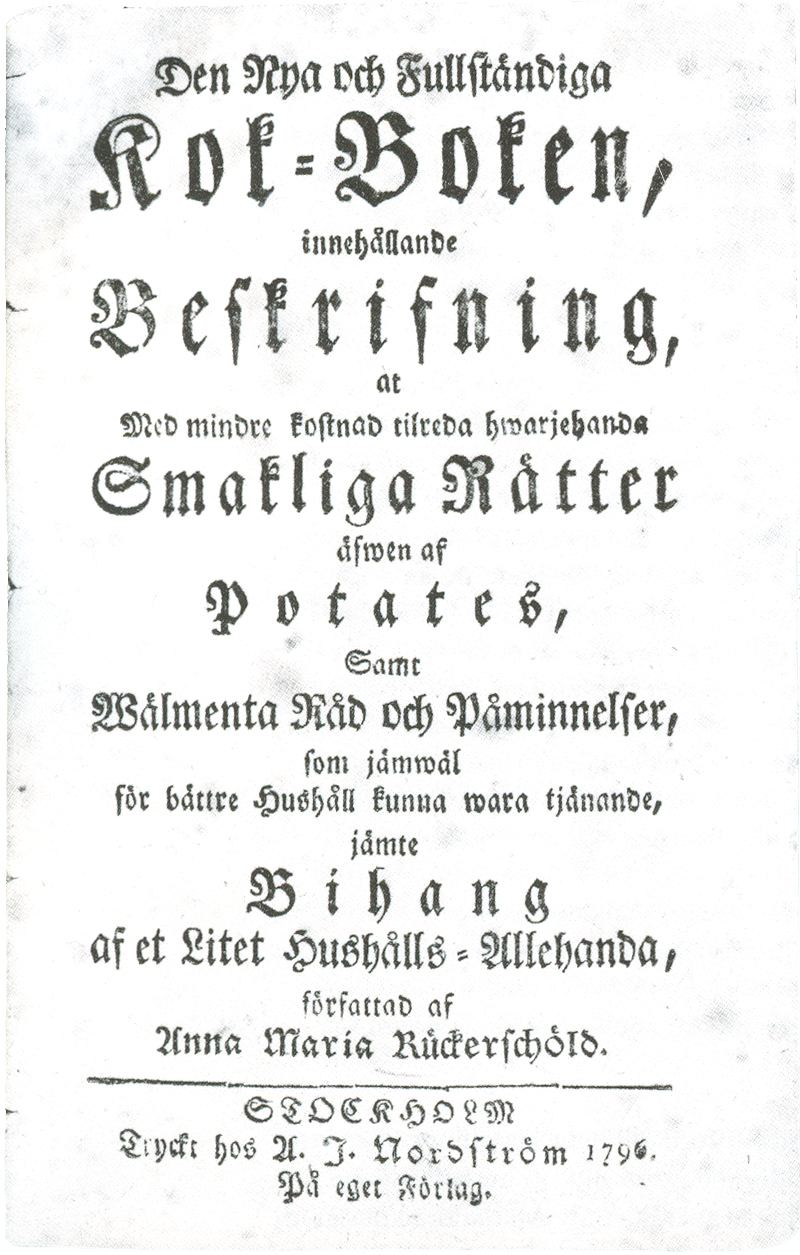
The title page of Den Nya och Fullständiga Kok-Boken from 1796, Rückerschöld's only work devoted almost entirely to cooking.

Anna Maria Rückerschöld (born Rücker; 5 February 1725 – 25 May 1805) was a Swedish writer who wrote several popular books on housekeeping and cooking in the late 18th and early 19th century. She was an advocate of women's right to a good education in household matters and propagated this view in public debate through an anonymous letter in 1770. Along with Cajsa Warg and other female cookbook authors, she was an influential figure in culinary matters in early modern Sweden.

== Biography ==
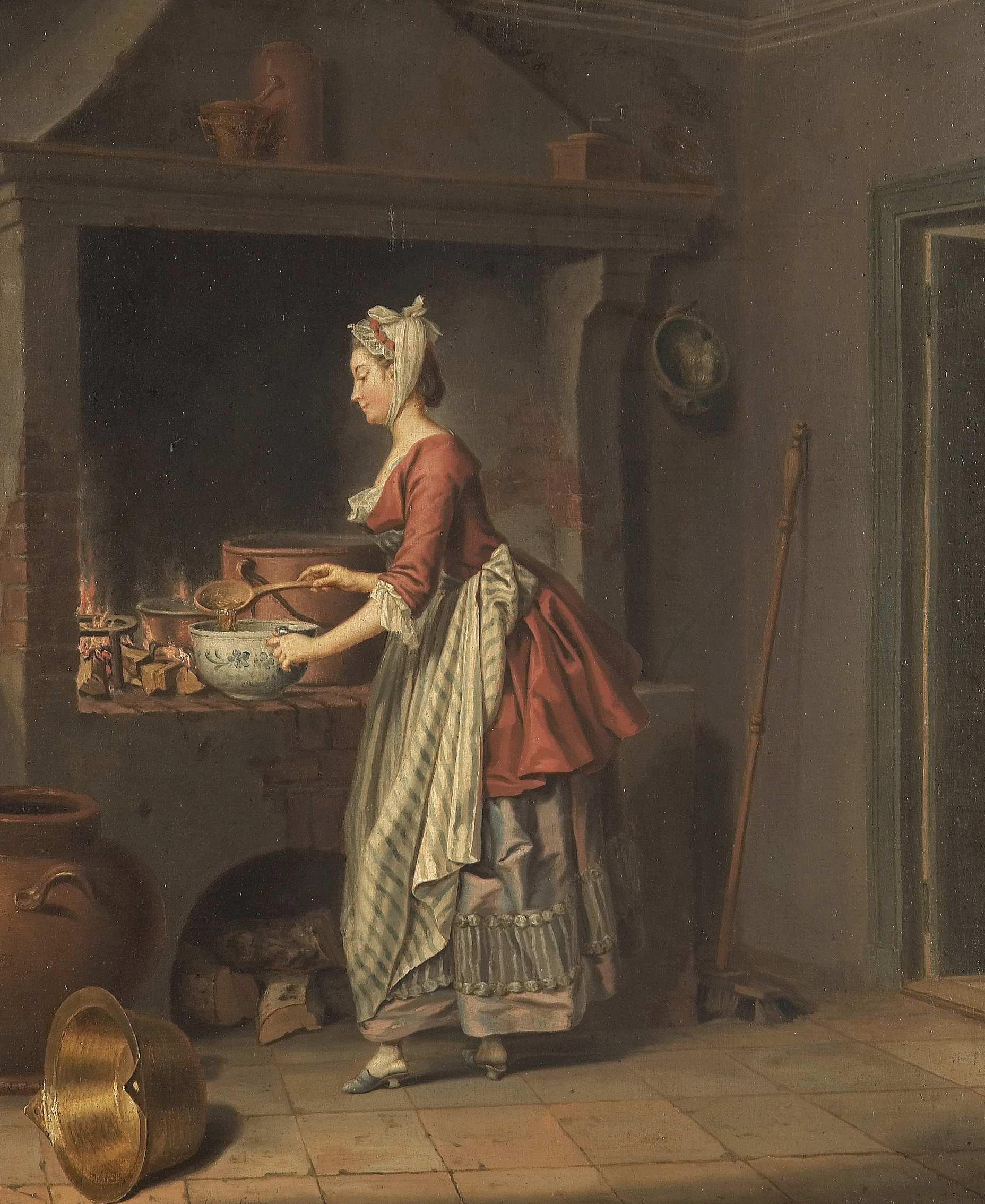
A painting of a kitchen interior from the second half of the 18th century. En piga öser soppa ur en kittel ("A maid pours soup out of a cauldron"); oil on canvas by Pehr Hilleström.

Rückerschöld was born on 5 February 1725. She was the daughter of Emerentia Polhem and Reinhold Rücker, a judge of the local hundred who was employed at the high court in Stockholm. She grew up in Stjärnsund and Hedemora, being one of ten children in the family, seven girls and three boys. The family was not part of the nobility, but belonged to the upper echelons of society and the father was eventually knighted in 1751, the same year as he died. Reinhold Rücker spent much time away from the home while working in Stockholm, leaving his wife to run the household. Rückerschöld was the granddaughter of inventor and industrialist Christopher Polhem and spent part of her childhood with her grandfather at his estate at Stjernsund. When Rückerschöld was twelve, her three brothers were sent to be educated at the prestigious Uppsala University. The seven sisters remained in Hedemora without receiving any formal education, which was the customary upbringing of girls at the time.

In 1750 Rückerschöld married Jonas Jakobsson Dahl, an accountant employed by the high court in Stockholm. Dahl was educated at Uppsala University and was the son of a factory owner. Rückerschöld kept her maiden name throughout her life, changing it only after her father was knighted in 1751 and -schöld ("shield") was added to his last name. Rückerschöld was 25 years old when she married and Dahl 33, eight years her senior. The couple had their first child, Emerentia, in 1751, and moved to Sätra gård in modern-day Upplands Väsby, north of Stockholm in 1760. Rückerschöld gave birth to three more children between 1759 and 1765, Maria, Fredrica and Christopher. A fourth child, Chierstin, died only seven hours after her birth. The other three children reached adulthood. Emerentia married a lawspeaker in Småland while her sister Maria Fredrica remained a spinster. Christopher went to sea, but was never heard from after that. The family moved from Sätra gård to Stockholm. The earliest record of their residence in Stockholm is from 1775, and the couple remained there the rest of their lives. Both parents survived their children; Dahl died in 1796 and Rückerschöld nine years later, on 25 May 1805, at the age of 80.

== Public debate ==
Rückerschöld is best known for her books on cooking and household work, but it has also been established that she wrote an article advocating household education for women. In February 1770 a letter with the title "Det Olyckliga Swenska Fruentimrets Böneskrift till Allmänheten" ("The unhappy Swedish woman's entreaty to the general public") appeared in the periodical Almänna Magazinet written by Fru D**, "Mrs D**" (likely "Mrs Dahl"). The letter has been attributed to Rückerschöld since it is known that she wrote a letter to Carl Christopher Gjörwell, publisher of Almänna Magazinet and other papers, only a few weeks later. In the letter she is grateful to Gjörwell for having one of her writings published, and expresses her wish that she would "live to see even the smallest amendment to the suggestions that I have ventured to adhort for the benefit of my sex".

The article was published during a period of intense public debate. Freedom of press had been established in 1766 and encouraged people to give their suggestions on how to improve Swedish society. Economy, emigration, agriculture and education were hotly debated issues, as well as the problematic situation for unmarried middle class women. Without a spouse a woman in 18th century Sweden could have great difficulty supporting herself, especially as lower ranking servants were often promoted to maids and thereby lowering the number of employment opportunities for unmarried women.

Rückerschöld defended the "natural" division between male and female spheres of work, but also advocated schools for women where they could be taught household duties, such as cooking, sewing and basic household economics. She believed the need for practical household knowledge should have priority over social skills intended to please, such as knowledge of music, embroidery and art. Through allegories, the letter expressed Rückerschöld's view on the relationship between the sexes, and her passionate concern for the well-being of her fellow women. She attempted to illustrate the gravity of the situation by comparing the plight of women with that of Philomela, a character in Greek mythology who was raped by her sister's husband and then had her tongue cut out to prevent her from speaking about the deed. She eventually managed to expose the husband by painstakingly explaining her story through embroidery.

Her passionate advocacy for the right of contemporary middle-class women to a solid education in housekeeping has led journalist and writer Ingrid Ärlemalm to describe Rückerschöld as a "cautious feminist". In the letter in Allmänna Magazinet, she also shows signs of being well-read and familiar with contemporary literature on pedagogy with quotes from François Fénelon's Traité de l'education des filles ("Treatise on the Education of Girls"), which had been published in Swedish translation 1762. Like Rückerschöld, Fénelon strongly advocated household education to for young women.

== Housekeeping and cooking ==
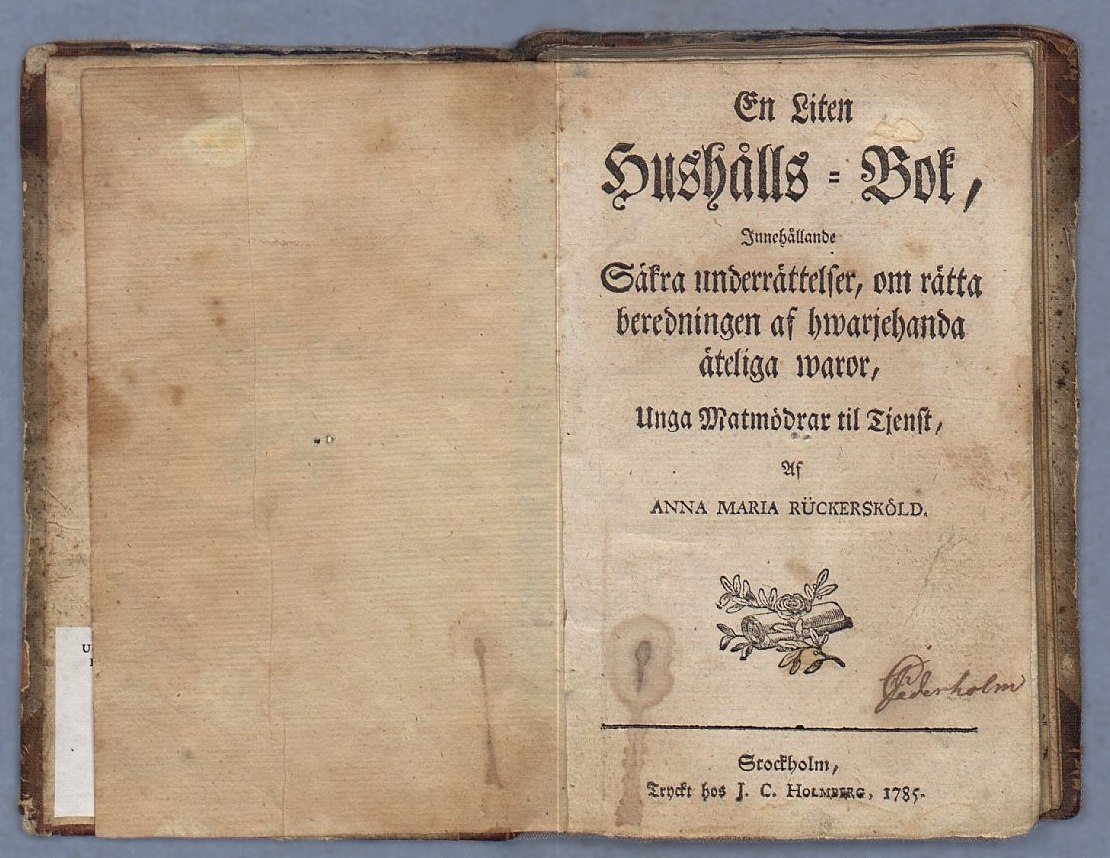
Title page from a first edition of En Liten Hushålls-Bok.

In 1785, fifteen years after she wrote her plea for female household education, Rückerschöld published En Liten Hushålls-Bok ( "A Small Household Book"). It was published in her own name, and contains various practical advice on efficient household management; cooking, cleaning, washing, brewing, butchering, etc. Rückerschöld was influenced by the mercantilistic economic ideas of her time, and advised readers to take better advantage of local produce, such as berries and mushrooms and using locally available products in favor of imports, such as substitution of wine with juice or vinegar made from homegrown fruit. There are few actual recipes for cooking, and all of them describe more everyday dishes such as simpler porridge and soup. For more refined cooking, Rückerschöld recommended other contemporary cookbooks, of which Cajsa Warg's is described as the foremost.

The book proved to be popular enough to be printed in two more editions and in 1796 Rückerschöld's first genuine cookbook was published, Den Nya och Fullständiga Kok-Boken ("The New and Complete Cookbook"). It was far larger than her previous work, over 300 pages, and included recipes for more refined dishes. Nevertheless, Rückerschöld tried to hold fast to her frugal ideals. In the foreword to the book, she described Cajsa Wargs cookbook as being too extravagant, though this is partially excused because it was written in a time of more abundance and by an author used to the lavish resources of a wealthy kitchen. In the book Rückerschöld continued to promote her goal that all women should be skilled homemakers and cooks; without such knowledge, they would not be able to fulfill their duties as women. Other than recommendations in the foreword, the book also contained a short chapter with descriptions of fictitious housewives that served as warning examples about neglecting housework in favor of beautification, reading, religion, or doing the chores of the servants. The ideal housewife is embodied only by the final example, Beningnia. By being humble, studious and knowledgeable, and being first to rise and last to go to bed, she becomes "the pride of her husband, pinnacle of the household, joy of servants, delight of friends, assuager of the poor, solace of the inconsolable, haven of the oppressed, and, finally, the envy of mean-spirited neighbors".

Before her death, Rückerschöld would write two more books on the topic of housekeeping and cooking: Fattig Mans Wisthus och Kök, ("Poor Man's Larder and Kitchen") and En Liten Hushålls-Cateches ("A Small Household Catechism"). The first book was published in 1796, and aimed for a broader readership than the previous books. This included not just modest urban households, but also peasant wives who made up the majority of the population in Sweden at the time. Again Rückerschöld stressed the importance that women know proper housekeeping skills, and urged them to take good care of the household economy to keep incompetent husbands from wrecking the family budget. Other than directions for simple dishes, there was money-saving strategies like baking one's own bread or cooperating with neighbors to buy larger quantities of food at lower prices. In the book Rückerschöld portrays herself as going on inspection in a peasant household, being shown the barn, larder, vegetable garden, etc., and having suggestions for improvements everywhere. Fattig Mans Wisthus och Kök was awarded a silver medal by Patriotiska Sällskapet ("The Patriotic Society") for being the first cookbook written for poorer households. Twenty years earlier, the society had issued a challenge with this aim, but no one before Rückerschöld had managed to write such a book. In 1797, one year after the book was first published, a second edition came out.

En Liten Hushålls-Cateches came out in 1800 and was only 43 pages long. In her last book Rückerschöld repeated her previous stances about the importance of knowing household skills, and that girls should be allowed to partake in household work from an early age rather than being pampered and taught impractical skills. While stressing that a woman's God-given station was in the home and that she should be accustomed to humility and obedience, she also encouraged women to take matters in their own hands; the lack of household education could only be alleviated by sharing information and passing on knowledge from one generation to the other.

== Bibliography ==
- "Det Olyckliga Swenska Fruentimrets Böneskrift till Allmänheten" 1770 (published under a pseudonym)
- En Liten Hushållsbok (1785)
- Fattig Mans Wisthus och Kök (1796)
- Den Nya och Fullständiga Kok-Boken (1796)
- Försök till en liten Hushålls-Cateches (1800)

== See also ==
- Cajsa Warg
- Swedish cuisine
- Early modern European cuisine

== Sources ==
- (in Swedish) Helmius, Agneta "Det Olyckliga Swenska Fruentimret": Om kokboksförfattarinnan Anna Maria Rückerschöld och kvinnors villkor på 1700-talet. Polhemsstiftelsen i Stjernsund, Hedemora. 1993.
- (in Swedish) Ärlemalm, Inger Cajsa Warg, Hiram och de andra: om svenska kokboksförfattarinnor. Ordalaget, Bromma. 2000. ISBN 91-89086-15-5
