= Book scouting =

Book scouting is the process whereby a book in one language or market is brought to the attention of a publisher in another language or market.

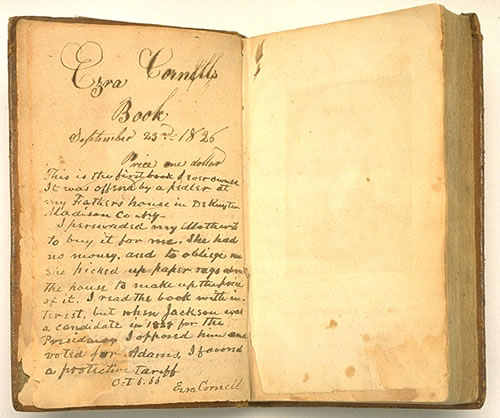
An open book.

== Information ==
Book scouts are the individuals who carry out this process. Many book scouts in a particular market work on retainer for one or more publishers or literary agencies in another market. When a potentially interesting book in the book scout's market is published, the book scout will make their clients in the other market aware of this literary property. There is no conflict of interest for the book scout in representing multiple publishers, so long as there is no overlap in the type of book being scouted. For instance, a book scout cannot represent two or more romance novel publishers, but is free to represent a business publisher and a science publisher for the same particular market.

There are also book scouts for Hollywood, ferreting out books from the publishing industry and presenting them to Hollywood studios, producers, directors and stars.

A classical book scout, or a literary scout, is a person who works with foreign publishers and helps them find the next bestseller to bring to their market.
