= Beverly Gannon =

Hawaiian chef and restauranteur

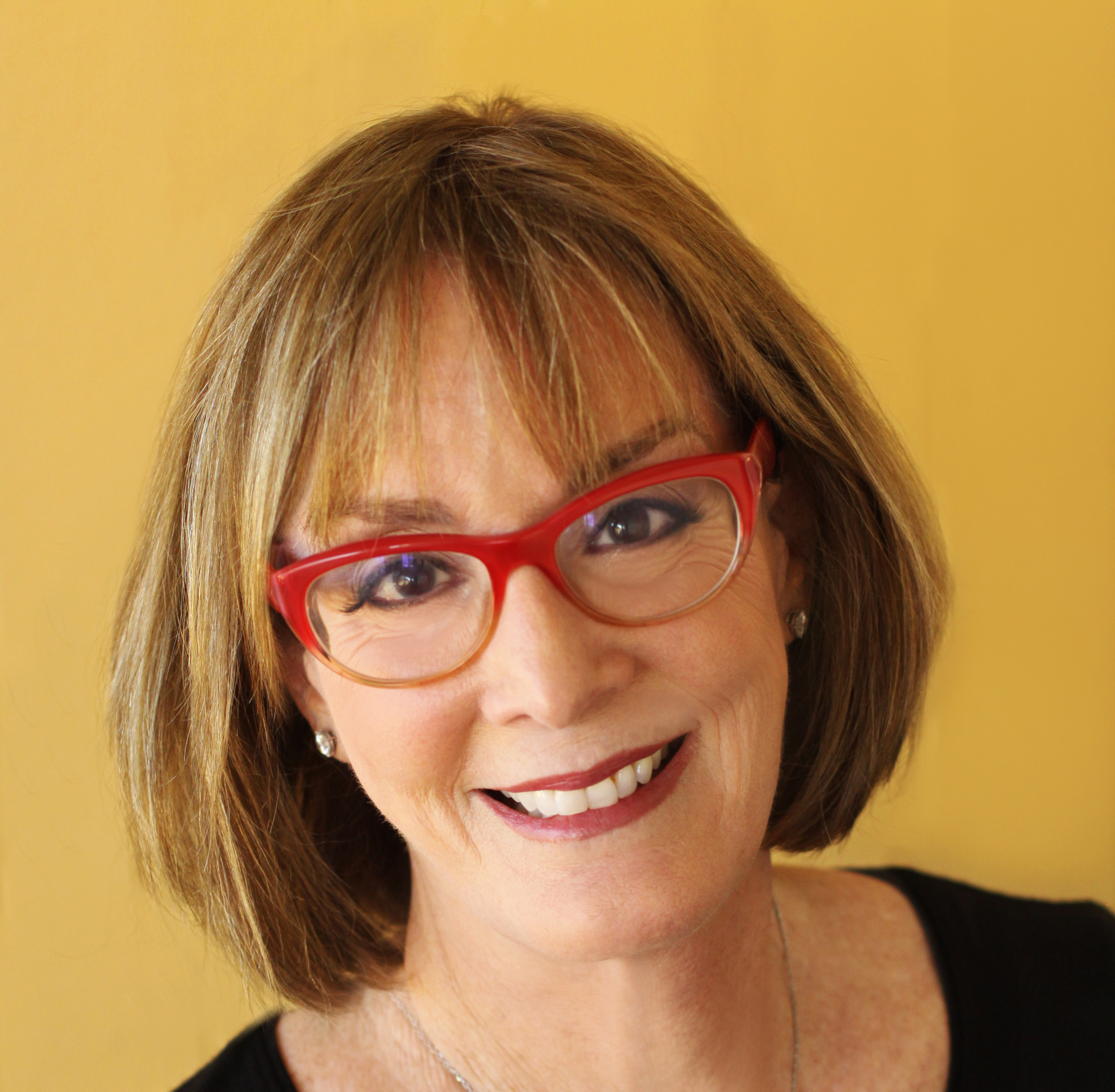
Bev Gannon

Bev Gannon (born c. 1949) is a Hawaiian cuisine chef, restaurateur and author. She is one of the dozen chefs credited with the development of Hawaii regional cuisine in the 1990s. Her restaurants on Maui include Hali'imaile General Store, Joe's Bar & Grill, and Gannon's. Several of her cookbooks have been published.

== Biography ==
Gannon was born Beverly Shanbaum into a Jewish family in Dallas, Texas. She attended the University of Colorado. Beginning in 1973 she worked in the entertainment business as a road manager for Liza Minnelli and a personal assistant for Joey Heatherton. In 1977 she studied at Le Cordon Bleu in London, then began a catering business in Dallas.

In 1980 she moved to Maui with her then-boyfriend Joe Gannon, a concert tour producer; they married a year later. Bev Gannon resumed her catering business out of her home kitchen in Makawao, in Maui's Upcountry district. In 1987 the Gannons acquired a lease on the Hali'imaile General Store in nearby Haliimaile and moved her business into the large, rundown 1925 building. The restaurant they opened there in 1988 was an immediate popular and critical success.

Gannon later opened two restaurants in Wailea: Joe's in 1995, and Gannon's in 2009. She also provided recipes for the restaurant at the remodeled Hotel Lanaʻi on the island of Lanaʻi. From 1999 to 2010 Gannon also served as the executive chef for Hawaiian Airlines. In 2015 Joe's adopted a new menu and was renamed Joe's Nuevo Latino, as Gannon announced plans to continue her business with the involvement of new partners; after the new menu proved to be unsuccessful, Joe's closed in August 2015.
