= Sabina Welserin =

German cookbook author

Sabina Welser, otherwise unknown, was the author of a German cookbook, Das Kochbuch der Sabina Welserin, which she dated 1553 in her brief epigraph. The Welser were members of the mercantile patriciate of Augsburg, international mercantile bankers and venture capitalists on a par with the Fugger and the Hochstetter. The manuscript was edited by Hugo Stopp and published as Das Kochbuch der Sabina Welserin. (Heidelberg: Carl Winter Universitätsverlag) 1980. It is one of a very few primary sources for the history of German cuisine.
