= Afnan Al Zayani =

Bahraini chef

- أفنان الزياني
- Born: Afnan Rashid Al Zayani; Manama, Bahrain
- Education: Texas Tech University
- Occupations: President of al zayani commercial services company, president of the bahrain businesswomen's association, presenter of cooking programs and author of cookbooks
- Notable work: first Bahraini cookbook in 1983, first Bahraini cooking show in 1986

Afnan Rashid Al Zayani (Arabic: أفنان راشد الزياني) is a Bahraini chef who was the first to publish a cookbook in the country in 1983, and hosted the country's first cooking show starting in 1986, entitled السفرة الخليجية ("Gulf Dining"). She was named the Middle East's leading businesswoman in 2004 by the magazine Hayatouki, in which she figured as one of 100 personalities who contributed to the economic empowerment of women.

== Early life and education ==
Al Zayani was born in Manama, where she grew up in a close-knit, traditional family. She received her Bachelor of Arts in Food Processing Technology from Texas Tech University in 1976.

== Career ==
Al Zayani pursued a career in the family business and assumed leadership positions that culminated in her buying one of the family companies in 1999. She soon became involved in regional networks of businesswomen, chairing the Bahrain Businesswomen's Association from 2002 to 2004. She set an ambitious agenda for the Association, including teaching businesswomen to benefit from the Bahrain–United States Free Trade Agreement and supporting small-to-medium enterprises. In 2006, she founded the Middle East and North Africa Businesswomen's Network, a regional grouping of such organizations, with the assistance of the United States Department of State and the U.S.-Middle East Partnership Initiative. She owns Al Zayani Commercial Services, a retailer of office equipment, and continues to serve on the Businesswomen's Association Board. From 2005 to 2013, she served as Chairwoman of the Businesswomen's Committee of the Bahrain Chamber of Commerce and Industry. She is one of the most prominent regional authors and TV personalities in the culinary field.

=== Early ideas ===
Al Zayani became interested early on in the participation of women in the labor force. She facilitated this idea through advocacy with civil society and the government to implement such reforms as the first family law.

==== Cooking ====
An avid cook, Al Zayani has promoted cuisine heavily in books and television, including iftar specials during Ramadan. Emphasizing health (especially of the immune system) as well as flavor, she won a 2009 prize for "Best Arabic Cookbook" at the Gourmand World Cookbook Awards as one of 136 authors from 44 countries. The award went to Afnaniyat, including 60 recipes in both Arabic and English; it was the only entry from the Gulf states. Subsequently, she has branched out into cookbooks aimed at children.

=== Exhibitions ===
Al Zanayi has participated in many book fairs and live shows by international chefs in various world-famous kitchens, using the opportunity to promote translations into other languages.

=== Rising popularity ===
She made her TV debut in 1986 with the show السفرة الخليجية, followed by several other programs, including one in English entitled Gulf Delights. In 1988, Al Zayani published A Taste of the Arabian Gulf, the first Gulf cuisine cookbook published in English. In 1992, she won the National Merit Award for her efforts to preserve the country's culinary heritage. In 1994, she published ما لذ وطاب ("What Is Good"), followed by the TV shows الأكل بذكاء عام ("Smart Eating Show," 1996) and طيبات ("Good Things," 1997). In 2004, she published لذائذ أفنان ("So This Is Afnan"), including recipes from her recent show لذائذ 5,4,3,2,1 ("So This Is 5,4,3,2,1"). In 2007, she presented the special أطيب من ("My Best"), an iftar special for MBC. She has hosted several shows on Qatar Television, including وعوافي ("Emotions," 2005), صحة وعافية ("Health and Wellness," 2006), and a TV show based on Afnaniyat in 2008. In 2012, she began hosting يلا نطبخ مع أفنان ("Let’s Cook with Afnan") on Bahrain Television.

=== Eish wa Malh ===
On June 25, 2014, Al Zanayi published Eish wa Malh (Arabic for "Bread and Salt"), her sixth cookbook featuring 75 recipes on 205 pages in both Arabic and English. She explained at the release ceremony that she titled it based on both the preponderance of salt in the recipes and the use of the expression in Egyptian Arabic to describe conviviality in dining among family and friends, akin to Gemütlichkeit in German. In an interview with the Bahrain News Agency, she explained the two years it took to edit bilingually, photograph, and curate the recipes for publication.

==== New recipes ====
Among the additions to her latest publication were new nutritional information and meals working for such health issues as Hypercholesterolemia, hypertension, diabetes. Fresh off Afnaniyat’s recognition by the Gourmand judges in 2009 as a bridge between civilizations in a simple, clear style, she entered the competition once more in 2014.

=== Cooking competitions ===
Al Zayani judges many cooking competitions in Bahrain. These include food festivals sponsored by civil society organizations. She notably chaired the panel, "مجموعة تركيز حول رائدة العمل البحرينية في مجال المطاعم والمقاهي .. الواقع والتحديات وآليات الاستدامة" (Focus Group on Bahraini Pioneers in the Restaurant and Café Field: Realities, Challenges, and Sustainability Mechanisms,” sponsored by the Supreme Council for Women.

== International recognition ==
Well-known internationally, Al Zayani was named by Forbes Middle East as one of the "50 Most Powerful Women in the Middle East" in 2005. She was also named by Arabian Business to the Power 100 in 2007. In 2010, she was among six women awarded the "Leadership in Public Life" Prize by the Vital Voices Foundation for her role in advancing women's leadership role in the Middle East and North Africa region and her election as the first president of the Middle East and North Africa Businesswomen's Network.
