= Sara La Fountain =

Finnish-American chef, author, and designer

- Born: Saara Kuronen; April 22, 1981 (age 45); Santa Barbara, California, United States
- Education: The Culinary Institute of America
- Culinary career
- Television shows: Avec Sara (2005); Perfect Day (2008); Saran ja Meri-Tuulin Metropolit (2012); 24Kitchen: Sara La Fountain (2013); Sara's Istanbul Delights (2017)
- Awards won: Gourmand World Cookbook Awards – Best First Cookbook 2006 à la Sara; Gourmand World Cookbook Awards – Best Cookbook Design 2010 Passion for Food
- Website: saralafountain.com

Sara La Fountain (born Saara Kuronen, April 22, 1981) is a Finnish and American chef, cookbook author, designer, and television personality. Born in Santa Monica, California, she grew up in Finland. After attending at the Culinary Institute of America, she returned to Finland and started her own business. She has written food columns and lifestyle articles for various Finnish magazines and newspapers. She gained recognition for her cookbooks and her cooking shows, also appearing as a guest chef in several television shows. Additionally, she has been involved in various brand collaborations with food companies and has also worked in tableware design and fashion modelling.

== Background ==
La Fountain was born in Santa Barbara, California, to a French American father and a Finnish mother, after they had met during the 1980 Winter Olympics in Lake Placid, New York. She has dual citizenship of Finland and the United States. Her mother is an artist and her father runs a family business, managing a restaurant and a hotel in New York. After her parents separated, La Fountain moved to Finland with her mother, who then married Kosti Kuronen, the Finnish architect, who has designed around 50 golf courses in Europe.

Raised in the Eira neighborhood of Helsinki, and in a family estate in Kirkkonummi, La Fountain also spent summers at Pyhäniemi Manor, owned by her mother's family at the time. For schooling, La Fountain attended the Waldorf School of Helsinki.

La Fountain was engaged to the film and music video director Antti Jokinen between 2005 and 2011.

As of 2013, La Fountain had apartments in the Kruununhaka neighborhood of Helsinki and the SoHo neighborhood of New York City.

== Education ==
La Fountain started her career as a trainee at Sokerileipuri Alenius, a traditional confectioner in Ullanlinna, Helsinki. She then went on to study at the Culinary Institute of America, a culinary school in Hyde Park, New York, also working in a local restaurant.

== Career ==
=== Entrepreneur ===
After returning to Finland from the Culinary Institute of America, La Fountain started her own business and was soon noticed by the Finnish media.

La Fountain has since written food columns and lifestyle articles for various Finnish magazines and newspapers, including Helsingin Sanomat, Ilta-Sanomat, and Seura, in which she had a weekly column, as well as other publications in Scandinavia, Europe and Southeast Asia. La Fountain also arranges cooking courses, does food styling and has her own catering service. She has also undertaken product development for different brands, including Fazer and Finlandia Vodka.

In 2010, La Fountain toured in the United States, including Miami, New York, Chicago, Dallas, and San Francisco, as part of the Slow Food USA charity programme. She created various new dishes for the Cooking with Finlandia Vodka dinners at Fairmont Hotels, and proceeds were donated to Slow Food USA.

=== Television ===
In 2005, La Fountain starred in her own lifestyle TV series called Avec Sara on MTV3 in Finland. Each of the 10 episodes had its own theme from brunches to birthday parties, karaoke nights and Japanese and Indian social evenings.

In 2008, La Fountain appeared on UKTV Food's popular Market Kitchen television series as a guest chef and starred in Perfect Day, which is a lifestyle television series sold to around 60 countries. Perfect Day includes four well-known Nordic chefs (Tina Nordström, Andreas Viestad, Claus Meyer and La Fountain herself) introducing traditional foods, customs and culture of their own countries, including Finland, Sweden, Norway and Denmark. In addition to the television show, La Fountain also starred in a 36-episode online series called A Perfect Day in Sara's Kitchen.

In 2012, La Fountain appeared as a guest chef on the 1st season (S1 Ep104 "Rye Bread for a Queen") and the 5th season (S5 Ep 505 "An Edible Park") of New Scandinavian Cooking on American Public Television and filmed her new television show for Finnish TV called Saran ja Meri-Tuulin Metropolit (Sara and Meri-Tuuli's Metropolises), co-starring her friend Meri-Tuuli Lindström. The show follows the hostesses' culinary journey around the world, including Cape Town, Istanbul, Madrid, Manila, New Orleans, New York City, Singapore, and Tel Aviv. The same year she also did food demonstrations in a reality show for Asian Food Channel where she travelled to Hong Kong, Malaysia, Singapore and Manila.

As of 2013, La Fountain has filmed new episodes for New Scandinavian Cooking and starred in her new cooking show 24Kitchen: Sara La Fountain, which has been sold to 35 countries around the world.

In 2014, she made two TV shows for Fox Network, in English and in Finnish.

In 2016, she starred in her own TV series “Sara's Australia Unveiled”, a 9-part episode series based on the experiences of amazing Australia with traveling, food, culture and lifestyle with a mix of outback lifestyle, local produce, Australian cuisines.

In 2022, she appeared on Netflix series Somebody Feed Phil "Helsinki".

=== Books and blogs ===
La Fountain was awarded the Best First Cookbook award at the prestigious Gourmand World Cookbook Awards in Kuala Lumpur, Malaysia, for her debut book à la Sara in 2006. In addition to the awards event, the Prime Minister of Malaysia also hosted a dinner party for the participants at his private residence.

The book version of Perfect Day television series was published in 2008. It includes recipes from all of the chefs and information on the various locations they visited in the course of the series.

On her third book, Passion for Food, published by Tammi in 2010, La Fountain has said: "My book goes through all the seasons as visual images of food. Each month has its own chapter, which has 10 different recipes and dining section. I take note of the seasonal events, such as the picnic season in spring and the mushroom and berry crops season in fall, not forgetting the classic holidays". The book was awarded a Best Cookbook Design award at the 2010 Gourmand World Cookbook Awards.

Since 2010, La Fountain has written her own blog, Passion for Fashion & Food, on the Internet and has blogged for a Finnish communication network DNA. She has also had her own food columns for Finnish fashion and lifestyle magazines Elle and Olivia and for British Men's Health magazine.

In 2013, La Fountain published her latest book Healthy Kitchen.

=== Brand collaborations ===
The majority of her time is spent in collaborating with different food brands developing new products, recipes, and doing food styling. She has done food development for the largest food corporations in Finland and also Europe, including Fazer, Café Picnic, Tabasco sauce, Bostorice, Risella, Finlandia Vodka and Valio. She's also created a menu for the Tallink Silja cruise line. La Fountain plans menus for restaurants and events, and provides cooking classes for companies at their private functions. Her latest projects include smoothies for Leader Natural Foods, a line of paninis for Snellman, and a campaign for light recipes using the products of German dairy producer Ehrmann.

=== Design ===
La Fountain has designed various series of tableware, glassware and textiles for the Finnish brand Luhta Home, including product lines Lotus, Baroque, Marocco and Agadir. She has also designed patterns for shoes of kitchen professionals by the Finnish Jalas footwear company.

=== Modelling ===
La Fountain started working as a part-time fashion model in her teens. She has since worked as a spokesperson for the shopping centre Kämp Galleria in Helsinki, the Finnish fashion brands Marimekko and Seppälä, and the Puma Women collection of PUMA in Finland. In 2013 she had a campaign with a well-known Swedish fashion company Hallens and 2014 she was the Supertalent of the month of May for big, world-known fashion brand Supertrash.

In 2012, La Fountain was voted as the Best Dressed Female at Finland's Elle Style Awards.

== Works ==
- Passion for Food. Tammi, 2010, ISBN 978-9513157333.
- à la Sara. 2013, Kustannusosakeyhtiö Otava, 2013, ISBN 978-9511278221.
- Healthy kitchen. Tammi, 2013, ISBN 978-9513173364.

== Accolades ==
La Fountain enjoys a reputation of being among the most beautiful women in Finland. In 2016, a Finnish internet discussion forum focused on football, FutisForum2, voted her as the hottest woman in Finland in a competition that lasted two weeks and included over 300 nominees. In the final of the multi-staged competition, she beat seven other contestants by gaining 21.5% of the total votes.
