= Stargate (music producers) =

Norwegian production and songwriting duo

- Origin: Trondheim, Norway
- Genres: R&B; pop; hip hop; dance-pop; Europop
- Occupations: Record producers; songwriters
- Years active: 1996–present
- Labels: RCA; Def Jam; Roc Nation; StarRoc
- Members: Mikkel S. Eriksen; Tor E. Hermansen
- Past members: Hallgeir Rustan

Stargate is a Norwegian record production and songwriting duo, composed of Tor E. Hermansen (born 14 October 1972) and Mikkel S. Eriksen (born 10 December 1972) and based in Los Angeles, California. The duo has been credited on hit songs and albums for American R&B, pop and hip hop acts.

Formed in 1996 in Trondheim, Norway, Stargate broke into the US recording industry in 2001, with their first major credit on the single "One Night Stand" by British girl group Mis-Teeq, which peaked within the top five of the Billboard Dance Charts. Stargate and Mis-Teeq saw further US chart success with the release of "Scandalous", which peaked at number two on the chart, as well as within the top 40 of the Billboard Hot 100.

In 2006, Stargate produced the single "So Sick" by American R&B singer Ne-Yo, which peaked atop the Billboard Hot 100. They have since produced ten songs that did so, such as Beyoncé's worldwide hit "Irreplaceable", and Katy Perry's "Firework". The duo has worked extensively with Barbadian singer Rihanna, having produced her singles "Don't Stop the Music", "Rude Boy", "Only Girl (In the World)", "What's My Name?", "S&M", and "Diamonds", all of which were met with worldwide commercial success.

In 2013, they produced the song "Almost Home" for Mariah Carey, which accompanied the Walt Disney film Oz the Great and Powerful and won the 2013 World Music Awards for the World's Best Video.

== Formation and early works ==
Stargate started in 1996 as a songwriting trio in Trondheim, Norway, consisting of Tor Erik Hermansen, Mikkel Storleer Eriksen, and Hallgeir Rustan (born 11 April 1966). When they first met, Hermansen was a talent scout for the Norwegian branch of Warner Music Group, Eriksen owned a studio, and Rustan was a mechanical engineer before becoming involved in music. One of their first successful productions was with Norwegian R&B singer Noora Noor, whose first album Curious was produced in their Trondheim studio. "Need You", her main hit from this album, was released throughout Europe and gave Stargate attention from the British music industry. While in Norway, they ventured into the British market, mostly writing songs for R&B and pop performers. At this time they called the team Stargate, a name specifically established for their projects in the United Kingdom.

Stargate's first international success came with British pop outfit S Club 7, whose 1999 single "S Club Party" reached No. 2 in Australia and No. 1 in New Zealand. This success was followed with Hear'Say's 2001 single "The Way to Your Love", which peaked at No. 1 in the United Kingdom. The team has also produced many Top 10 hits in the United Kingdom for acts such as Blue, Mis-Teeq and Atomic Kitten, and worked with European acts Javine, Shola Ama, Five, and Samantha Mumba.

The team had been listening to US hits and "trying to measure up". They remixed US hip hop and R&B songs, adding layers of melody to suit the European radio audience. In the wake of their early successes, the team had to choose whether to remain in Norway or move to pursue their goals: "We knew that to make the records we really wanted to make, we had to go to America." Hermansen and Eriksen chose to produce records in the US, while Rustan preferred to remain a producer in Norway since he did not want to leave his family behind.

In 2001, Stargate produced and co-wrote songs for US pop singer Mikaila's self-titled debut album. "So in Love With Two", a track from the album, had reached No. 25 on the US Billboard Hot 100, becoming one of the team's earliest co-written singles that appeared on the US charts. It was followed three years later with Mis-Teeq's "Scandalous", which peaked at No. 35 on the Hot 100 and No. 2 in the United Kingdom.

In the spring of 2005, Eriksen and Hermansen settled in New York. Initially, their work was slow until they met singer-songwriter Ne-Yo at Sony Music Studios in New York. Aware that Stargate produced R&B records, Ne-Yo, who had been working on his debut album, In My Own Words, decided to collaborate with the team. After listening to each other's music, a songwriting session ensued and spawned in its second day. The song "So Sick" later topped the Hot 100 and ushered Stargate into US pop songwriting.

== Notable collaborations ==
Stargate and Ne-Yo collaborated on the hit single "Unfaithful" for Barbadian singer Rihanna's 2006 album A Girl Like Me. In the same year, Stargate again collaborated with Ne-Yo for the single "Irreplaceable", recorded by US singer Beyoncé. The single topped the Billboard Hot 100 for ten consecutive weeks in 2006 and 2007. Also in 2006, Stargate and Taj Jackson gave singer-songwriter Lionel Richie with "I Call It Love", his first R&B hit in 10 years.

With the team's contributions to music, Stargate emerged as the No. 1 hot producer on the 2006 Billboard Year End Chart. In the following year, Stargate received a Spellemann (a Norwegian equivalent of the Grammys). The team received three awards at the 2007 ASCAP Pop Music Awards for the songs "So Sick", "Sexy Love" and "Unfaithful"; and two awards at the 2007 ASCAP Rhythm & Soul Awards for "So Sick" and "Sexy Love". They were named Songwriters of the Year at the 2007 ASCAP/PRS, receiving nine awards including Song of the Year for "So Sick".

In 2007, "Beautiful Liar", a duet between Knowles and Colombian singer Shakira, became another hit for Stargate, reaching No. 1 in more than 30 countries including the United Kingdom. The song earned Hermansen and Eriksen the Ivor Novello Award for Best-Selling British song (the song was composed by British songwriters Amanda Ghost and Ian Dench, thus making it eligible for the award).

At the 2008 ASCAP Pop Music Awards, Hermansen and Eriksen received five awards for most performed songs, with "Irreplaceable" among the top five. Stargate was named Best Hitmakers in Rolling Stone magazine's "Best of Rock 2008". At the 2008 Grammy Awards, Eriksen and Hermansen received nominations for five separate songs in six categories, including Record of the Year for "Irreplaceable", Best R&B Song for "Hate That I Love You" and Best Dance Record for "Don't Stop the Music".

On Ne-Yo's third album, Year of the Gentleman, Stargate produced and co-wrote four songs, including the singles "Closer" and "Miss Independent", the latter of which reached No. 1 on the Billboard Hot R&B/Hip-Hop Songs chart. At the 2009 Grammy Awards, Stargate received nominations in more than 10 categories, winning Best R&B Song for "Miss Independent".

In 2010, Stargate produced Wiz Khalifa's song "Black and Yellow", which reached No. 1 on the Hot 100, and Sean Kingston's "Letting Go". They also produced five No. 1 singles for Rihanna: "Rude Boy", "Only Girl (In the World)", "What's My Name?", "S&M", and "Diamonds". In 2012, Stargate co-wrote and co-produced Owl City's single "Shooting Star" on the EP of the same name.

In 2013, the song "Almost Home", co-produced and performed by Mariah Carey for the film Oz the Great and Powerful, won the World Music Award for the World's Best Video.

As a favour, Stargate also produced the song "The Fox (What Does the Fox Say?)" for Norwegian duo Ylvis. The song was intended as a joke for Ylvis's Norwegian talk show, but became an unexpected viral hit, with over 900 million YouTube views as of December 2019. The video was produced in return for the Ylvis brothers portraying the Stargate duo in a mockumentary.

In 2015, Stargate produced and co-wrote Coldplay's smash single "Adventure of a Lifetime."

== Other ventures ==
=== Star Roc ===
Stargate teamed-up with hip hop mogul Jay-Z to launch the record label StarRoc. The label, which is based at Jay-Z's Roc the Mic studio in Manhattan, will be a 50/50 partnership with the team and Jay-Z's entertainment company Roc Nation. Eriksen and Hermansen's connection with Jay-Z, then the CEO of Def Jam Recordings, began with the release of "So Sick"; they met through then-Def Jam A&R Tyran "Ty Ty" Smith, a longtime friend of Jay-Z. StarRoc released one album, the self-titled release from Alexis Jordan, in 2011. As of 2016, the website's registration has expired. No posts have been made on the label's Instagram account since mid-2013, and its Twitter postings ceased in March 2014. The current status of the label is unknown.

=== Stellar Songs ===
In addition to their new venture, Eriksen signed a global co-publishing deal with EMI Music Publishing which would further EMI's involvement with Stargate's future projects. Prior to the deal, EMI had been involved with Hermansen's projects for nearly ten years since he signed a deal in 1999. Hermansen and Eriksen agreed to also continue their joint-venture partnership, Stellar Songs, with EMI, and remain with their long-time managers Tim Blacksmith and Danny D.

=== LAAMP ===
In 2021, Eriksen and Hermansen launched the Los Angeles Academy for Artists and Music Production (LAAMP), a year long intensive music programme for 45 writers, artists and producers. The programme features mentoring from Ne-Yo, Charli XCX, JetsonMade, Emily Warren and John Cunningham. Jeff Rabhan, chairman of the Clive Davis Institute of Recorded Music, joined the programme as executive director.

=== Non-musical ventures ===
Mikkel Eriksen owns part of the Norwegian clothing firm JohnnyLove which they are trying to introduce to the US market. On the US launch party in New York on 12 October 2011, Jay-Z came to show his support and explained to the reporter that he was "a little bit Norwegian, as I am sure you know."

Tor Erik Hermansen owns a third of the award-winning Norwegian St. Lars restaurant in Oslo, together with international TV chef Andreas Viestad and Face2Face-founder Per Meland. Queen Sonja of Norway and former Norwegian prime minister Jens Stoltenberg are regular guests. The owners have tried to bring some of the ambience from the New York restaurant The Spotted Pig, owned by Jay-Z, to the restaurant.

== Influences and style ==
Stargate chiefly produces songs in the R&B, pop, dance-pop, Europop and hip hop genres. Hermansen and Eriksen grew up as R&B and hip hop fanatics in the Norwegian suburbs, where most youths listen to Europop and American rock music. Their interest in music started in the 1980s with breakdance and rap. Eriksen and Hermansen were raised on pop music, growing up listening to ABBA (both were Scandinavian) and German pop outfit Boney M. In an article by The New York Times, Jive Records president Barry Weiss, who had hired Stargate to produce songs, said, "Those influences lend themselves to them making very melodic pop records, with great hooks and choruses." According to the team, they have always loved American pop music, citing acts such as Prince, Michael Jackson, Usher, Destiny's Child, and R. Kelly, as well as the British band Depeche Mode, as their inspiration. The team also cited producers Antonio "L.A." Reid and Kenneth "Babyface" Edmonds of the 1980s R&B band The Deele, and R&B-pop production team Jimmy Jam and Terry Lewis as their early influences.

In their usual production style, Stargate first creates an instrumental backing track—also common in pop and hip hop productions—from which a collaborator would write lyrics and add a vocal melody to. In an interview with About.com, the team explained:

We always start out with a musical idea. Great effort goes into creating a solid melodic core. We both play the keyboards and program, but in general Mikkel plays the instruments and controls Pro Tools, while Tor has the executive overlook as well as lyrical input. However, we both are hands on and have no rules or limitations. When we have some killer beats and musical starting points, we hook up with one of our favorite topline writers, who gets cracking on the lyrics and melody. We make sure there's a lot of melody in the track, so it can inspire the writer. Together with the topline writer we work, often tweak and simplify the song, and never quit before we feel we've got a killer hook.

Ben Sisario of The New York Times described Stargate's music as "sugary, lilting R&B in the Michael Jackson vein leavened with the kind of melody-rich European pop that paints everything in bright primary colors ... Their work carries on a tradition of Scandinavian bubble-gum artistry that stretches from Abba to Max Martin". Sisario added that, unlike other producers in the US, "Stargate signature is more difficult to detect, because to some degree the duo's style is an adaptable method, not a specific sound". However, Atlantic Records A&R Steve Lunt pointed out that "if you put a bunch of Stargate songs together you will see the thread running through them".

== Critical reception ==
Critics found some of Stargate's succeeding works a replica of the musical formula of "Irreplaceable". Regarding the song "Tattoo" by Jordin Sparks, Rob Sheffield of Rolling Stone commented that the team "have no shame about churning out 'Irreplaceable' replicants forever", reprising the acoustic guitar-drum loop formula. The New York Times music critic Kelefa Sanneh said it "sounds like a cousin" of "Irreplaceable". The release of Chris Brown's 2007 single "With You" produced similar impressions: Sheffield, in his review for Brown's album Exclusive, believed that Stargate was "just trying to roll out 'Irreplaceable' one more time". Hillary Crosley of Billboard magazine wrote that "With You" "leans a bit too heavily" toward "Irreplaceable". Stylus Magazine also noted that Rihanna's Stargate-produced single "Hate That I Love You" was a rehash of the duo's previous work with Ne-Yo: "Here you've got the 'Sexy Love' drums, the 'Irreplaceable' strum, and a bit of the synth and chorus melody from 'So Sick'... is hardly the new twist all these old bits need to sound fresh."

== Discography ==
=== Singles ===
==== As lead artist ====
Title	Year	Peak chart positions										Certifications	Album
Title	Year	NOR	AUS	CAN	FRA	GER	ITA	NZ	SWE	SWI	UK	Certifications	Album
"Wilder" (featuring Tyler)	2001	—	—	—	—	—	—	—	—	—	—		Non-album singles
"Easier Said Than Done"	2002	—	—	—	—	—	—	—	—	—	55		Non-album singles
"Waterfall" (featuring Pink and Sia)	2017	30	19	86	36	47	81	— (Note: "Waterfall" did not enter the New Zealand Singles Chart, but reached number one on the New Zealand Heatseekers Singles chart.)	67	38	47	ARIA: Gold	Non-album singles
"1Night" (featuring PartyNextDoor, 21 Savage and Murda Beatz)	2018	—	—	—	—	—	—	—	—	—	—		Non-album singles
"Folk er fake" (featuring OnklP & Unge Ferrari)	2018	—	—	—	—	—	—	—	—	—	—		Non-album singles
"Be Right Here" (with Kungs featuring Goldn)	2018	—	—	—	77	—	—	—	—	—	—		Non-album singles
"—" denotes a recording that did not chart or was not released in that territory.

==== As featured artist ====
Title	Year	Album
"Carry You Home" (Tiësto featuring Stargate & Aloe Blacc)	2017	Club Life, Vol. 5 - China
"Rise Up" (Stargate featuring Nelson Mandela)	2018	Global Citizen – EP 1 (by Los Unidades)
"Voodoo" (Stargate and Los Unidades featuring Tiwa Savage, WizKid, Danny Ocean and David Guetta)	2018	Global Citizen – EP 1 (by Los Unidades)

== Grammy Awards nominations ==
Year	Nominee / work	Award	Result	Ref.
2008	"Irreplaceable"	Record of the Year	Nominated	
2008	"Don't Stop the Music"	Best Dance/Electronic Recording	Nominated	
2009	Year of the Gentleman	Album of the Year	Nominated	
2010	I Am... Sasha Fierce	Album of the Year	Nominated	
2011	Teenage Dream	Album of the Year	Nominated	
2011	"Only Girl (In the World)"	Best Dance/Electronic Recording	Won	
2022	"Hero"	Best Dance/Electronic Recording	Nominated	

== See also ==
- Category:Stargate (record producers) songs
- Category:Song recordings produced by Stargate (record producers)
