= St. Lars restaurant =

St. Lars
- Interactive map of St. Lars

Restaurant information
- Established: 2011
- Owners: Andreas Viestad, Per Meland and Tor Erik Hermansen
- Food type: Raw or grilled food. Local produce.
- Dress code: Casual
- Location: 59°55′35.55″N 10°43′51.66″E; Thereses gate 45, Oslo, N-0354, Norway
- Website: www.stlars.no

St. Lars is a grill-restaurant in the borough Bislett in Oslo, Norway. It is owned by international TV-chef Andreas Viestad, Face2Face communications agency founder Per Meland and Stargate-producer Tor Erik Hermansen. The restaurant is known for using meat from horses and bear, and even pigs from Bygdø Royal Farm's petting zoo. Everything apart from their horse tartar has been cooked on a custom made grill. The cuisine is based on serving raw or grilled food with an emphasis on Norwegian produce and unusual cooking techniques. The owners have tried to bring some of the ambience from the New York-restaurant The Spotted Pig, owned by Hermansen's StarRoc partner Jay-Z, to their restaurant.

On several occasions St. Lars has collaborated with winemaker and musician Sigurd Wongraven from Satyricon on special music and food weeks that has included dj-sets from artists like Knut Schreiner from Turbonegro.

For Christmas 2012 St. Lars bought all the pigs from the petting zoo at Bygdøy Royal Estate and had them as their main attraction on their annual Christmas menu.

== Clientele and awards ==
The restaurant is frequented by notables such as Queen Sonja of Norway and the former Norwegian prime minister Jens Stoltenberg. In 2012 the restaurant was voted "restaurant of the year" by Natt & Dag. The restaurant has received favorable reviews from all major Norwegian newspapers.

== Horse meat ==
During the "horse meat scandal" or the 2013 meat adulteration scandal that shocked European consumers on the beginning of 2013, St. Lars' horse beef tartar became their best-selling starter dish. Owner Andreas Viestad got a lot of media attention claiming that correctly prepared horse beef was the best meat to be had.

== Grill stolen ==
In the morning hours of June 6, 2012 the restaurant's custom made grill was stolen by four men in a van. Viestad who called the grill "the Rolls Royce of grills", told the press he thought it was an ordered theft. The grill was never recovered.
