= New Scandinavian Cooking =

Television series

- Genre: Cooking
- Starring: Andreas Viestad, Tina Nordström, Claus Meyer, Sara La Fountain, Niklas Ekstedt, Christer Rødseth
- Country of origin: Norway
- Original language: English

Production
- Production company: Tellus Works Television AS

Original release
- Release: 2003 – 2024

New Scandinavian Cooking is a Scandinavian cooking show which, over the course of sixteen seasons, has been hosted by Andreas Viestad, Tina Nordström, Claus Meyer, Niklas Ekstedt, and Christer Rødseth. It is produced by the Norwegian production company Tellus Works Television AS in collaboration with American Public Television (APT). A sequel series titled Perfect Day continued with the original hosts in rotation, with the cast addition of Sara La Fountain. In the United States it is primarily aired on PBS television stations.

The success of the series is in part due to its original format, its hosts and the series production teams. The food is not prepared in a studio but executed on location outdoors, at a mobile kitchen often situated in faraway places, such as remote beaches or mountain precipices. The hosts showcase different regions and dishes of Norway, Sweden, Denmark, Finland, Iceland, and Greenland.

Beginning in 2003, the show debuted on PBS in the United States (72% of the 347 regional PBS channels). It has also been broadcast in more than 130 other countries, including the United Kingdom, China, Germany, Italy, and France, to a viewership of 100 million per episode, according to show producers. The first, second, fourth, fifth, and sixth seasons were hosted by Norwegian food writer Andreas Viestad, the third season by Swedish chef and television personality Tina Nordström, and the fifth season was hosted by Danish chef and cookbook author Claus Meyer. The sixth season, a sequel series titled Perfect Day rotated the original hosts Viestad, Nordström, and Meyer, with the addition of Finnish TV chef Sara La Fountain. The seventh season was once again named New Scandinavian Cooking, and still rotated between the Nordic hosts. During the eighth and ninth seasons, Andreas continued the series on his own, with his storytelling, fusing history, nature, and cooking – seeking out the origins of the food with his mobile kitchen. In season 10 which was broadcast in 2013, the last of the Nordic countries was introduced to the series namely Iceland, the land of fire and ice. Season 11 (2014) reintroduces Swedish chef Tina Nordström in rotation with Norwegian chef Andreas Viestad.

On September 15, 2020, New Scandinavian Cooking officially announced Christer Rødseth as the new host of the program beginning with the show's 16th season. Due to delays in the production of Season 16, episodes with Christer did not air until 2024.

The show has its own streaming service on Vimeo. Seasons 7 through 16 (US Seasons 1 through 10) are available via PBS Passport. In addition, select episodes can also be streamed on Amazon Prime Video.

== Episodes ==
As of 2024 there have been a total of 173 episodes produced over 16 seasons. Starting with Season 7, the show has been produced in conjunction with American Public Television (APT) who produces and distributes shows for public television stations in the United States. In the United States, the seasons that are shown on public television stations have a different numbering system than the overall numbering system. The episodes shown in the United States typically start with Season 7, but are referred to as Season 1. Hence the discrepancy between the two numbering systems being six seasons apart.

=== Season 1 (2003) ===
The first season of New Scandinavian Cooking featured 13 episodes, all of which were hosted by Andreas Viestad. The focus of this season was Norway.

| Episode Number | Episode Title | Hosts | Countries Visited | Description |
|---|---|---|---|---|
| S01E01 | Royal White Halibut | Andreas Viestad | Norway | Andreas travels to Norway's northernmost county Finnmark, where he goes fishing for halibut with some local fishermen. He cooks the halibut in an old fashion way, on top of hot stones in the sand, stuffed with herbs and wrapped in seaweed. |
| S01E02 | Honey-Coated Lamb | Andreas Viestad | Norway | Andreas takes us to the beautiful west coast and to the city of Bergen, one of Norway's most important cities. He prepares a deeply flavored fish soup, a lamb cabbage stew and honey glazed leg of lamb with root vegetable. |
| S01E03 | Merry Christmas | Andreas Viestad | Norway | Andreas travels to Røros in the middle of inland Norway. Christmas is around the corner and to keep up with traditions he prepares a delicious rice pudding, salmon with sweet mustard sauce and pork ribs with cloves. |
| S01E04 | The Lofoten Cod | Andreas Viestad | Norway | Andreas visits Lofoten in northern Norway, where he goes cod fishing and prepares a delicious cod roe and cucumber salad. Inside an old fishing storage house, he adds exclusive truffles to the cod and serves it with a potato-garlic puree. |
| S01E05 | Arctic Cuisine | Andreas Viestad | Norway | Andreas takes the trip to Spitsbergen, where he prepares Russian Svalbard borscht. After speeding on the ice on a snow mobile to Longyearbyen, he cooks a vodka marinated sirloin steak and bakes pears with ginger and juniper berries. |
| S01E06 | Salmon | Andreas Viestad | Norway | Andreas goes fishing for wild salmon on the Namsen River in Mid-Norway, and with the catch he makes different versions of slow baked salmon with soy sauce and ginger, chervil mayonnaise and aquavit sour cream. |
| S01E07 | A Midsummer Night's Meal | Andreas Viestad | Norway | Andreas presents some of his favorite spots in Oslo, where he makes food for summer with plenty of herbs to marinate a steak, a classic shrimp sandwich and homemade almond brittle ice cream. |
| S01E08 | In the Heart of Fjordland | Andreas Viestad | Norway | Andreas travels to Hardanger in western Norway, where the fruit trees are in full bloom. Inspired by the lush region he makes an apple and goat cheese pie, and wild game from the valley, venison seasoned with juniper berries. |
| S01E09 | Food for Summer | Andreas Viestad | Norway | Andreas visits the southern coast of Norway, a real summer paradise for the Norwegians. He goes fishing for mackerel and smokes the fish before making a seasonal salad, and he also serves fresh shellfish from the grill. |
| S01E10 | The Provence of the North | Andreas Viestad | Norway | Andreas travels to Lom in the heart of inland Norway, where he picks his absolute favorite herb, dill. You can never use to much of dill in your cooking, so he makes dill snaps and dill scented chicken stuffed with dill. |
| S01E11 | Crayfish and Salmon | Andreas Viestad | Norway | Andreas goes foraging outside Oslo, and picks a selection of mushrooms for a soup. He catches crayfish in a small lake and with the forest's pantry he makes some fantastic food: dill boiled crayfish and baked salmon with local mushrooms. |
| S01E12 | The Best Cheeseburger in the World | Andreas Viestad | Norway | Andreas hikes to the top of Norway in the majestic Jotunheimen, the mountain range offers wild berries and game, so he makes blueberry pancakes, and an exclusive cheeseburger made with grouse, venison, pork and goose liver. |
| S01E13 | A Balancing Act | Andreas Viestad | Norway | Andreas visits the Pulpit Rock in south western Norway. On top of the flat summit he makes a classic salad with Norwegian sardines, and on an island outside Stavanger he serves a quiche with sardines and a very tasty salmon mousse. |

=== Season 2 (2004) ===
There were 13 episodes produced in this season, all of which were hosted by Andreas Viestad. The focus of this season was Norway.

| Episode Number | Episode Title | Hosts | Countries Visited | Description |
|---|---|---|---|---|
| S02E01 | Faithful Friend | Andreas Viestad | Norway, Brazil | Andreas visits Ålesund, the Bacalao capital of Norway. Dried and salted cod has made Norway famous in the Portuguese and Spanish speaking regions of the world, so Andreas travels further to Rio de Janeiro in Brazil to see for himself. |
| S02E02 | Ugly But Delicious | Andreas Viestad | Norway | Andreas visits Svolvær in Northern Norway, and the spectacular archipelago of Lofoten. He goes fishing during the World Championship in Cod Fishing, and he cooks both cod and some of the ugliest fishes from the sea. |
| S02E03 | Fierce Creatures | Andreas Viestad | Norway | Andreas travels to the southern tip of Norway, and to the idyllic coastal town of Loshamn, where he goes lobster fishing. Andreas prepares to classic dishes with his catch: Lobster Bisque and Tarragon Lobster. |
| S02E04 | My Summer Paradise | Andreas Viestad | Norway | Andreas takes us to Lista in South Western Norway, and to his family farm, where he prepares foods from the land, sea and the forest surrounding Viestad farm. Perfect summer dishes in his summer paradise. |
| S02E05 | Potatoes in All Forms and Flavors | Andreas Viestad | Norway | Andreas visits the valley of Gudbrandsdalen in central Norway where everything tastes of potato, the most important crop in the country: Potato Pancakes, Potato Soup and Flambéed Pork Chops served with a luxurious Potato Gratin. |
| S02E06 | Where Everything Smells of Apples | Andreas Viestad | Norway | Andreas travels to Hardanger in Western Norway. This is the Norwegian fruit garden, with a special micro-climate perfect for growing apples, and where all the food he makes has a smell of apple. |
| S02E07 | Bread and Butter Issues | Andreas Viestad | Norway | In the forests surrounding Oslo, Andreas prepares bread on a stick over an open fire, and he visits Bogstad Farm where he bakes three types of Norwegian bread: plain, with herbs and a version with nuts, fruit and different seeds. |
| S02E08 | Town of Two Spirits | Andreas Viestad | Norway | Andreas travels to Trøndelag in Norway, where he combines cooking and storytelling to show how alcohol and religion share much of the same history in Trondheim. He prepares mulled wine, aquavit sorbet and meatballs with sage and prunes. |
| S02E09 | The Sun Is Back | Andreas Viestad | Norway | Andreas visits Geilo and the highlands of Norway in winter. He prepares hot chocolate with orange marmalade cream, and serves both fish and chicken stuffed with oranges and for dessert Orange à la Norvegienne. |
| S02E10 | King of the Ocean | Andreas Viestad | Norway | Andreas goes fishing in Finnmark, where he makes a colorful king crab sandwich served on a slice of dark rye bread, and as main course pan-seared king crab in soy butter with pomegranate and red berries from the North. |
| S02E11 | Polar Berries | Andreas Viestad | Norway | Andreas picks berries in the far north of Norway. In the Lyng Alps he serves a traditional birthday cake, a layered with cream and northern berries. For main course, Andreas prepares venison filet with local berries from the North. |
| S02E12 | Learning How to Smoke | Andreas Viestad | Norway | Andreas boards the Hurtigruten in Bergen to end up on Sommarøy in Northern Norway. He investigates the culinary traditions of smoking food and serves smoked salmon in an egg, and for main dish, a pork roast smoked on a grill. |
| S02E13 | Highlights from the First and Second Seasons | Andreas Viestad | Norway | All memorable moments from the first and second seasons of New Scandinavian Cooking, where we revisit some of the spectacular places and recipes. |

=== Season 3 (2006) ===
There were 13 episodes produced in this season, all of which were hosted by Tina Nordström. The focus of this season was Sweden instead of Norway.

| Episode Number | Episode Title | Hosts | Countries Visited | Description |
|---|---|---|---|---|
| S03E01 | An Island Well Done | Tina Nordström | Sweden | Tina makes food for summer, on the island of Gotland. She rides her bicycle to a farm with local Gotland's sheep, and Tina also tries out fire eating at the yearly Middle Age festival in the historic town of Visby. |
| S03E02 | Royal Swedish Meat Balls | Tina Nordström | Sweden | Tina visits the capital of Sweden, and presents Stockholm with all its aquatic beauty. She makes Swedish meatballs, and some lovely scallops with blueberry vinaigrette. |
| S03E03 | Midsummer Nights Cream | Tina Nordström | Sweden | Midsummer is very much celebrated in Sweden, and Tina invites us to Dalarna - the heartland of Sweden, where she prepares a real Midsummer Nights meal to some locals: traditional schnapps, cured salmon and a grand strawberry cake. |
| S03E04 | Topping Off at the Tip | Tina Nordström | Sweden | Tina goes paragliding over the shores of Skåne in Sweden. This is her home county, and Tina visits Ystad and Ale Stenar, where she cooks a great variety of existing dishes. |
| S03E05 | Wild West Cooking | Tina Nordström | Sweden | Tina goes horseback riding in Vemdalen near the Swedish-Norwegian boarder, where she explores the proud food traditions of the area. Tina catches a regional delicacy, the whitefish, and cooks it wrapped in paper over an open fire. |
| S03E06 | Early Noble Harvest | Tina Nordström | Sweden | On board an old paddle steamer, Tina travels to Skokloster Castle in Uppland just north of Stockholm in Sweden. This is a historically fantastic place, and also where Tina uses the fresh produce of Spring: new potatoes, salads and rhubarb. |
| S03E07 | Ice Cold Cooking | Tina Nordström | Sweden | Tina visits the far north in Sweden, where she goes downhill skiing and competes in exotic reindeer racing. In Abisko, Tina goes fishing on a frozen lake and prepares a hearty hunters stew at the famous Ice Hotel in Jukkasjärvi. |
| S03E08 | The Coast Is Clear | Tina Nordström | Sweden | Tina visits a sailing race, that starts from the West coast of Sweden and goes all around the southern tip of the country into the Baltic Sea. She serves a big buffet for the winners: marinated meat, a lemon sorbet and chili salad. |
| S03E09 | A Wild Game | Tina Nordström | Sweden | Tina visits south of Sweden and the Kingdom of Crystal, Glasriket, in Småland. In the forest she goes wild boar hunting, and makes different pickles and sausages, before she serves the main dish, a wild boar stew. |
| S03E10 | Deep Dining | Tina Nordström | Sweden | On the beautiful rugged Swedish West Coast, Tina dives for oysters in the North Sea and prepares a seafood buffet with lobster, mackerel, oysters and Norway lobster. |
| S03E11 | Christmas Buffet | Tina Nordström | Sweden | Christmas is all about food and Tina travels to Värmland and to Hennickehammar Manor in Sweden, where she presents all kinds of Christmas treats: mulled wine, traditional Swedish ham and sweet candy. |
| S03E12 | Fish Capital | Tina Nordström | Sweden | Tina travels to the West Coast and to Gothenburg, the fish capital of Sweden. Here she visits the city's fish market, and prepares a crispy shrimp salad, both high and low at Liseberg Amusement Park. |
| S03E13 | The Crayfish Party | Tina Nordström | Sweden | Tina travels aboard a historical cruise ship on Göta Canal in Sweden, and after catching some local crayfish on lake Vättern, she invites for a very traditional Swedish crayfish party. |

=== Season 4 (2007) ===
There were 13 episodes produced in this season, all of which were hosted by Andreas Viestad. With the return of Andreas, the focus of the show shifted back to Norway.

| Episode Number | Episode Title | Hosts | Countries Visited | Description |
|---|---|---|---|---|
| S04E01 | To the Lighthouse | Andreas Viestad | Norway | Andreas visits a remote lighthouse on the island of Fedje in Western Norway, and the Atlantic coastline offers the best of local shellfish and Norway lobster. |
| S04E02 | The World's Best Sausages | Andreas Viestad | Norway | Andreas travels to Ryfylke in southwestern Norway, where he prepares sausages on the slopes of the fjord, creates a flavor-packed homemade ketchup and mixes a shockingly elegant drink on a glacier. |
| S04E03 | Back in Paradise | Andreas Viestad | Norway | Andreas invites to his family's summer house, on the southern tip of Norway, where he spends summers living off the land. Andreas uses ingredients from his own pantry in his cooking. |
| S04E04 | The Flatlands | Andreas Viestad | Norway | Andreas visits Lista in southern Norway, where makes his favorite pancakes. He also goes underwater to catch a turbot, a "flat" fish he later prepares with an elegant combination of vanilla and root vegetables. |
| S04E05 | Nuclear Family Food | Andreas Viestad | Norway | The cold Norwegian winter does not stop Andreas from scaling the Gaustad mountain, and in this chilly landscape, he prepares a warm mushroom soup and lamb shanks with a Norwegian-style risotto. |
| S04E06 | The World Is My Scallop | Andreas Viestad | Norway | In search of some of the world's best shellfish, Andreas travels to Frøya in South Trøndelag in Norway. He prepares appetizers, delicious fried scallops and makes Norwegian-style sushi using ingredients straight from the Norwegian sea. |
| S04E07 | Fighting Geese | Andreas Viestad | Norway | Andreas visits Indreøy in Nord-Trøndelag in Norway, this is one of the most fertile agricultural regions in the country, and he serves two different pates and a roasted duckling to the owner of one of the oldest farms in the area. |
| S04E08 | The Pearl of Fjords | Andreas Viestad | Norway | Andreas visits the beautiful Geiranger Fjord in Western Norway. He fishes trout in a small stream, and climbs up the cliffs hanging over the fjord to cook on an old farm clinging to the steep hill side, it is truly a unique place. |
| S04E09 | Milk Seeking Eternity | Andreas Viestad | Norway | Andreas travels to Sognefjord, and the historic Kviknes Hotel in Western Norway, to investigates Norwegian dairy traditions, and he even milks a cow to create the freshest possible milkshake. |
| S04E10 | The Cognac of the North | Andreas Viestad | Norway, France | Andreas embarks on a search for his country's favorite drinks, that takes him from Norway to France. He uses brandy when slow-cooking moose meat in front of the Castle of Triac in Cognac. |
| S04E11 | Salmon River | Andreas Viestad | Norway | Andreas visits Ryfylke in South Western Norway, where he catches a salmon with his bare hands, and cooks the fish over an open fire. |
| S04E12 | The River Is My God | Andreas Viestad | Norway | In Alta, Andreas finds the great produce from the northernmost region of Norway. He goes salmon fishing on the river, and prepares a sinfully rich dark chocolate cake. |
| S04E13 | Buffet | Andreas Viestad | Norway | Andreas travels aboard the historic cruise ship Hurtigruten, and presents the highlights from the series, New Scandinavian Cooking. |

=== Season 5 (2007) ===
There were 13 episodes produced in this season, all of which were hosted by Danish chef Claus Meyer. The focus of this season was primarily in Denmark instead of Norway.

| Episode Number | Episode Title | Hosts | Countries Visited | Description |
|---|---|---|---|---|
| S05E01 | The Rich South | Claus Meyer | Denmark | Claus Meyer investigates the rich pastry tradition in the spectacular marshlands of southern Jutland. He goes fishing for a local delicacy, Rømø shrimps, and literally right on the German border, he prepares Danish sausages. |
| S05E02 | Food Where the Lilacs Bloom | Claus Meyer | Denmark | Claus visits the stylish Steensgaard Manor in Faaborg, on the island of Funen in Denmark, where he makes an unforgettable rhubarb trifle. Claus also go to the sandy beach to catch shrimps, with a net bag. |
| S05E03 | White Gold | Claus Meyer | Denmark | Claus Meyer discovers an 800 year old salt boiling tradition on the island of Læsø, and shares with us his best recipe for "boiled potatoes". Close to the port of Vesterø, Claus tries out some local honey from a nearly lost species of bees. |
| S05E04 | Cooking of Light | Claus Meyer | Denmark | Claus goes to Skagen and the Grenen beach, the northernmost point of Denmark. He serves up some stylish fish cakes with rye bread, and visits the lively fish market in Skagen with its typical Danish charm. |
| S05E05 | Sunny Strawberries and Golden Rape Seed Oil | Claus Meyer | Denmark | Claus gets on his bike and heads down to the rocks of the island of Bornholm, where he makes a surprising dish with herring, pickled green strawberries and mustard seeds. |
| S05E06 | A Dairy's Dream | Claus Meyer | Denmark | Claus Meyer takes us to the north of Zealand. He investigates the local Danish dairy traditions, and meets up with a bio-dynamic farmer, who loves his cows more than anything else. |
| S05E07 | The Lure of the Mountain | Claus Meyer | Denmark, Norway | Claus travels by boat from Denmark to Norway, and serves some typical dishes of the North: Herring with potatoes, dill, butter and aquavit, and in the breathtaking Norwegian mountains, grouse with wild berries. |
| S05E08 | Stones and Pomes | Claus Meyer | Denmark | Claus visits his own home region in Denmark, Fejø and Lilleø, the idyllic islands of the southernmost point of Scandinavia, where some of the most tasty and aromatic apples in the world are grown. |
| S05E09 | Danish Brew | Claus Meyer | Denmark | Claus visits the "Fuglebjerg" farm outside Copenhagen and investigates Danish beer history. He takes a close look at Nordic style micro brewing and discusses biodiversity in the vegetable garden with Camilla Plum. |
| S05E10 | Sea Bed Soil | Claus Meyer | Denmark | Claus visits Lammefjord in Denmark. This is root vegetable paradise, famous for carrots in various shapes and colors, cultivated on reclaimed agricultural land, with an elevation of 7.0 meters (23 ft) below sea level. |
| S05E11 | Water of Shells | Claus Meyer | Denmark | Claus visits Løgstør and the Limfjord in Denmark, North Jutland. Every year the town is turned upside down when the mussel festival is taking place. Claus of course, is making some fantastic blue mussel dishes. |
| S05E12 | Ice Water Cooking | Claus Meyer | Greenland | In this arctic adventure Claus travels to Greenland, and uses the famous Greenland shrimp in his cooking. He goes out on the ice fjord to catch halibut, and Claus virtually dances with the musk ox before making a delicious tartar. |
| S05E13 | Cooking in the Woods | Claus Meyer | Denmark | Claus travels to the city of Aalborg, and by the old Viking burial site he prepares a pate from hare and pheasant. Claus drinks water from a thousand year old spring, and at Voergaard Castle he prepares a game dish for supper. |

=== Season 6 (2008) ===
Season 6 was originally released as a spinoff series called Perfect Day and had a rotating set of hosts including Andreas Viestad, Tina Nordström, Sara La Fountain, and Claus Meyer. There were 13 episodes produced in this season. The focus of this season varied for each episode. These are now considered to be part of New Scandinavian Cooking as Season 6.

| Episode Number | Episode Title | Hosts | Countries Visited | Description |
|---|---|---|---|---|
| S06E01 | Fire and Ice | Tina Nordström | Norway | Tina Nordström hikes the glacier in Western Norway, before she takes us to Lofoten, a string of islands stretching into the Atlantic in Northern Norway, where she visits a longbow house at the Viking museum, Lofotr. |
| S06E02 | Among Lakes and Berries | Sara La Fountain | Finland | Sara La Fountain hikes among the lakes, pine trees and hilltops in the heavily forested region of Karelia, near Finland's border with Russia. She makes porridge over an open fire and learns how to make the perfect stock. |
| S06E03 | Noble Causes | Andreas Viestad | Norway | In his hometown of Oslo, the capital of Norway and home of the Nobel Peace Prize, host Andreas Viestad prepares a homegrown, yet exotic, modern Norwegian meal. |
| S06E04 | Smokey Flavors | Claus Meyer | Denmark | Host Claus Meyer visits Hvide Sande on the windy coast of Jutland, in Western Denmark, where fisheries and lighthouses dot the coastline. |
| S06E05 | Helsinki on a Plate | Sara La Fountain | Finland | In Helsinki, the capital of Finland, host Sara La Fountain makes a traditional Finnish dish on a rooftop, and visits an island fortress to make a "pink" picnic |
| S06E06 | A Taste of the Island | Tina Nordström | Finland | Tina Nordström visits Åland, Finland's autonomous island in the Baltic Sea, where she prepares delicious food on the deck of an historic ship. |
| S06E07 | Secrets of the Baltic Sea | Sara La Fountain | Finland | Sara La Fountain visits a local fisherman in Åland in the Baltic Sea, before she prepares whitefish on board a large sailing ship. La Fountain also scuba dives among the shipwrecks in the area. |
| S06E08 | A Ship with High Spirits | Andreas Viestad | Norway, Denmark | Andreas Viestad follows in the footsteps of his ancestors by sailing between the capitals Copenhagen and Oslo, aboard an old sailing ship. He makes Brazilian-style dishes from dried Norwegian cod and unveils the story of aquavit. |
| S06E09 | Green Paths | Claus Meyer | Denmark | On a crisp and clear winter day, Claus Meyer visits the white cliffs of the island Møn in Denmark, where he makes vitamin-packed juice and cooks codfish on the beach. |
| S06E10 | Strait Across | Tina Nordström | Sweden, Denmark | Tina Nordström starts at the southern tip of Sweden before she bikes to the Danish capital of Copenhagen, a city known for its open-faced sandwiches and smoked fish. |
| S06E11 | Southern Comfort | Andreas Viestad | Norway | Andreas Viestad visits Stavanger, where he cooks delicious fish courses and a spectacular dessert prepared with performance art, that involves manipulation of fire. |
| S06E12 | Sara's French Connection | Sara La Fountain | Finland, France | Sara La Fountain begins her cooking journey on the islands of Åland in Finland's apple county, and ends up in Cognac, a French region famous for producing the brandy, cognac. |
| S06E13 | Deep Sea Harvest | Tina Nordström | Norway | Tina Nordström visits a fish farm in Jøsenfjorden in South Western Norway, where she prepares white halibut, and pampers herself at a local spa. |

=== Season 7 (US Season 1) (2010) ===
This is the first season of New Scandinavian Cooking that was produced in conjunction with American Public Television (APT) in the United States. There were 11 episodes produced in this season, all of which were hosted by Andreas Viestad. However, two episodes had co-hosts (Sara La Fountain and Claus Meyer).

| Episode Number | Episode Title | Hosts | Countries Visited | Description |
|---|---|---|---|---|
| S07E01 | Common, Yet Tasty | Andreas Viestad | Norway | Andreas takes us to Northern Norway and Bodø, where the fisheries are so rich that people have a great range of choice, but the favorite fish is still the modest of them all. |
| S07E02 | Slow River Dining | Andreas Viestad | Norway | Andreas takes us on board an old steamer on the canals of Southern Norway and the Halden River, a boat trip full of springs' fresh delicacies, from steamed and grilled asparagus, multi-flavored fish cakes and a fish terrine. |
| S07E03 | The Mother of Invention | Andreas Viestad | Norway | Andreas goes up into the highlands of Southern Norway, in the area of Hallingdal, where the fight for survival in old times has led to the invention of many delicacies. |
| S07E04 | Rye Bread for a Queen | Andreas Viestad, Sara La Fountain | Finland | Finnish chef Sara La Fountain has invited Andreas to take the trip to the "rye belt" in southern Finland. They travel together on the old Kings' Road, where they both make some of their favorite recipes. |
| S07E05 | Mackerel: The Shiny Bounty of Summer | Andreas Viestad | Norway | Andreas visits the Southern Norwegian resort town of Kristiansand, he takes us fishing for mackerel and along the way he cooks a variety of fish dishes. |
| S07E06 | Many Flavors of Lamb | Andreas Viestad | Norway | During the annual sheep gathering, Andreas travels through the South Western part of Norway and Rogaland. He cooks beer-braised lamb shanks and 'A One Pot Wonder'. |
| S07E07 | Food for a Viking | Andreas Viestad, Claus Meyer | Denmark | Andreas joins chef Claus Meyer, in South Western Denmark and Ribe, the oldest town in Scandinavia, where Claus and Andreas guide us through cooking and stories of the past. |
| S07E08 | Yesterday's Food for the Future | Andreas Viestad | Norway | Andreas visits Rygge, the vegetable garden of South Eastern Norway, where he revisits some old favorites: root vegetables, hen and goat meat. |
| S07E09 | The Holy Fish | Andreas Viestad | Norway | Andreas investigates the mystical and delicious halibut in Helgeland, where it has found a perfect breeding ground, along the rugged coastline in Northern Norway. |
| S07E10 | Winning Game | Andreas Viestad | Norway | Andreas visits the fjord's snow-capped mountains in Sognefjord on the West Coast, where the deer run free and the mountain farms cling intrepidly to sheer slopes. |
| S07E11 | Pyramids of the North | Andreas Viestad | Norway | Andreas visits the island of Spitsbergen and Longyearbyen, the northernmost inhabited place in the world. This barren land offers some surprising delicacies. |

=== Season 8 (US Season 2) (2011) ===
There were 11 episodes produced in this season, all of which were hosted by Andreas Viestad. The focus of this season was primarily in Norway.

| Episode Number | Episode Title | Hosts | Countries Visited | Description |
|---|---|---|---|---|
| S08E01 | Shellfish for Summer | Andreas Viestad | Norway | Andreas visits the favorite summer holiday destination in Southern Norway, Blindleia. In this summer paradise he goes fishing for red shrimp, gathers mussels on the bare face rock. |
| S08E02 | Sweet Tooth and Old-Fashioned | Andreas Viestad | Norway | Andreas travels to one of the coldest towns in Norway. UNESCO World Heritage-listed Røros is a place that seems like it has been frozen in time, where tradition rules on the table. |
| S08E03 | Dry But Tasty | Andreas Viestad | Norway, Italy | Throughout history codfish has been one of Norway's most important commodities, loved in much of the world. Andreas follows the codfish from its origin near the Lofoten Islands in Northern Norway, to the table in Italy. |
| S08E04 | All Is Well, If There's Herring | Andreas Viestad | Norway | Andreas takes us to places along the coast that was founded on the rich herring fisheries. Inspired by history, Andreas shows how to make herring Scandinavian style. |
| S08E05 | Shellfish Eldorado | Andreas Viestad | Norway | Andreas travels to some of the richest fishing banks in Mid Norway, and shows how to make the best scallops around and a dish with crabs and Norway lobster. |
| S08E06 | Fat Ducks and Sweet Apples | Andreas Viestad | Norway | Andreas visits a duck farm before he continues his trip with an old steamer along the Telemark canal in South Western Norway. This is a water system that unites the coast of Norway with the barren mountain regions. |
| S08E07 | On Top of Norway | Andreas Viestad | Norway | Andreas visits the highest mountain in Norway, Galdøpiggen. Fall is coming and nature is ready to share the fruits of summer, in this case the berries, raped by long, cool, bright days. |
| S08E08 | A Modest But Generous Spud | Andreas Viestad | Norway | Andreas takes us to the South Inland region of Norway and cooks with one of the most loved Norwegian ingredient, namely the potato. |
| S08E09 | A World of Apples | Andreas Viestad | Norway | Andreas visits Hardanger, the fruit garden of Western Norway, where everything smells of apples. |
| S08E10 | Ice Cold Bounty | Andreas Viestad | Norway | Andreas takes us to the rugged coastline of Vesterålen in Northern Norway. He prepares cod and Arctic char, both from the fresh cold North Sea. |
| S08E11 | Smoke and Water | Andreas Viestad | Norway | Andreas takes us to Vestfold in Eastern Norway. Winter is here and fishing for sardines in the Fjord of Oslo is on its peak, and inspired by Scandinavian tradition Andreas smokes the little fish. |

=== Season 9 (US Season 3) (2012) ===
There were 8 episodes produced in this season, all of which were hosted by Andreas Viestad. The focus of this season was primarily in Norway.

| Episode Number | Episode Title | Hosts | Countries Visited | Description |
|---|---|---|---|---|
| S09E01 | Rich Farmland | Andreas Viestad | Norway | Andreas visits the county of Hedmark in Eastern Norway, a region with big farms and an abundance of produce, it is also home to Norway's first cookbook writers. |
| S09E02 | Popular Sausage | Andreas Viestad | Norway | Sausages serves a special function in Norway, both as an everyday meal and as food for festivities, so there is a lot of culture and history in a well-made sausage. |
| S09E03 | It All Starts with Kids | Andreas Viestad | Norway | Andreas invites us to his newly opened food culture center for kids, Geitmyra Farm in the middle of Oslo. The kids makes cereal breakfast together with Andreas, and for dessert he serves sweet pumpkin and yogurt. |
| S09E04 | Oil Adventure | Andreas Viestad | Norway | Andreas travels to Eastern Norway to find out if cold-pressed rapeseed oil is the olive oil of the North. |
| S09E05 | Coastal Express | Andreas Viestad | Norway | Andreas travels the southwards along the coast of Norway, using the produce he finds along the way. The journey starts in the Sami territories of the Arctic, 69 degrees north. |
| S09E06 | Fire in the Belly | Andreas Viestad | Norway, Japan | Using local salmon in his cooking Andreas starts off with an open fire, and he makes cured salmon following an ancient recipe in Northern Norway, before he travels to Japan to discover that sometimes the best way to cook a fish, is not to. |
| S09E07 | Captain Haddock | Andreas Viestad | Norway, Scotland | Andreas investigates the food culture on the wind blown peninsula of Stadt in Western Norway, and after a trip to Scotland to meet the official fish and chips champions, he makes Norwegian version, touched by smoke. |
| S09E08 | Rain and Rainbows | Andreas Viestad | Norway | Andreas travels to Bergen, the wettest city in Norway, where it rains 280 days a year, a city built on fish. Andreas prepares local trout, and his version of the city's famous fish soup. |

=== Season 10 (US Season 4) (2013) ===
There were 10 episodes produced in this season, all of which were hosted by Andreas Viestad. The focus of this season was primarily in Norway.

| Episode Number | Episode Title | Hosts | Countries Visited | Description |
|---|---|---|---|---|
| S10E01 | Packed to Go | Andreas Viestad | Norway | In the middle of the capital Oslo, Andreas goes foraging for wild herbs and shares his favorite bread recipe to make a packed lunch. This is an important part of Scandinavian food traditions, and it is taken just as seriously as a dinner. |
| S10E02 | The Sweetest Cheese | Andreas Viestad | Norway | Andreas visits the valley of Gudbrandsdalen, home to the brown fudge cheese. It is a unique delicacy and a versatile cooking ingredient, and he combines it with roasted goat and a sweet caramel ice cream. |
| S10E03 | Close to Home | Andreas Viestad | Norway | Andreas goes looking for wild herbs, together with the world's foremost forager Miles Irving from Great Britain, to find out what's eatable along the shores of Southern Norway. |
| S10E04 | Back to the Roots | Andreas Viestad | Iceland | Andreas discovers how ancient traditions and innovation co-exist. Afterwards, he grills lamb over an open fire, Viking style. The dessert is made from Skyr, a special Icelandic dairy culture, served with local berries. |
| S10E05 | Mighty Volcanic Oven | Andreas Viestad | Norway | Andreas travels to Iceland, the Norse settlement in the middle of the Atlantic Ocean, where he combines the sea and the land to create elegant and ruff dishes. |
| S10E06 | The Grain Belt of the Country | Andreas Viestad | Norway | Andreas visits Nes in Eastern Norway, the grain belt of the country. Cereals are a staple food in Scandinavia, and they are used for more than just bread. |
| S10E07 | Mountain Lamb | Andreas Viestad | Norway | Andreas visits the mountain of Hallingskarvet and the beautiful valley of Hemsedal, where the lambs roam the hilly landscape for months during summer, and he cooks with the aromatic and gamey meat. |
| S10E08 | The Smokehouse | Andreas Viestad | Norway | Andreas visits the smokehouses of Western Norway. Smoke was originally used as a preservative, but this tradition brought with it the benefit of great flavor as well. |
| S10E09 | Milk and Chocolate of the North | Andreas Viestad | Norway, St, Lucia | Nobody eats more chocolate than Norwegians. Andreas makes a warming hot chocolate with saffron and orange cream in the middle of a winter-dressed Oslo, before he travels to St. Lucia in the West Indies to discover the origins of cocoa. |
| S10E10 | The Northern Way | Andreas Viestad | Norway | Andreas travels south on the Coastal Express, and investigates historical food from two of Norway's former capitals, Trondheim in Mid-Norway and Bergen on the West Coast. |

=== Season 11 (US Season 5) (2014) ===
There were 13 episodes produced in this season. Andreas Viestad and Tina Nordström shared hosting duties this season. Sara La Fountain co-hosted one of the episodes with Andreas. The focus of this season was primarily in Norway.

| Episode Number | Episode Title | Hosts | Countries Visited | Description |
|---|---|---|---|---|
| S11E01 | A Taste of Winter | Tina Nordström | Norway | Hiking food is an important part of Scandinavian food traditions. Tina makes a packed lunch, and after a day of winter activities a warm soup with meatballs. |
| S11E02 | Fish on a Platter | Tina Nordström | Norway | Tina visits the windswept islands of Hitra and Frøya, where the Norwegian Sea offers crystal clear water with all kinds of shellfish and salmon. |
| S11E03 | Land of Fish and Apples | Tina Nordström | Norway | Hardanger is Norway's fruit garden, and Tina visits the beautiful fjord valley as the fruit trees are in full blossom. |
| S11E04 | The Taste of Trees | Andreas Viestad | Norway | Andreas visits Hedmark in Eastern Norway, a region with large farms, an abundance of food and vast forests. He serves the viewers inspiring tips on how to use smoke in cooking. |
| S11E05 | An Edible Park | Andreas Viestad, Sara La Fountain | Norway | Andreas and our Finnish host Sara visit one of Oslo's most popular city parks, The Frogner Park. Both Andreas and Sara mix a festival drink and prepare real festival food - a hearty hamburger and sausages. |
| S11E06 | Summer on a Plate | Andreas Viestad | Norway | Andreas makes some coastal delicacies on the island of Hvaler in Eastern Norway, where many Norwegians travel to celebrate midsummer. |
| S11E07 | Fisherman's Harbor | Tina Nordström | Sweden | Tina visits Smögen on the beautiful coast of South-Western Sweden, famous for its fisheries and holiday resorts. |
| S11E08 | Hiker's Food | Tina Nordström | Norway | Tina visits Gamlestølen in the mountainous heartland of Norway. She goes fishing and makes baked trout with herbs wrapped in cured ham. |
| S11E09 | Bergen Food Renaissance | Andreas Viestad | Norway | Andreas visits Bergen in Western Norway to present the city's food culture. He meets up with a local chef, Christopher Haatuft, and together they collect oysters and wild scallops. |
| S11E10 | Mountain Riches | Tina Nordström | Norway | In the mountain region of Valdres, Tina makes fried Norwegian fudge cheese, creamy mushrooms with cured mutton, and thick pancakes with cognac raisins. |
| S11E11 | Farmer's Food | Tina Nordström | Norway | Tina visits Moss and the nearby islands, a rich agricultural region in Eastern Norway, where she makes something very special: glazed pigeon breast with vinegar pork belly and beets. |
| S11E12 | Drama on a Plate | Andreas Viestad | Norway | Andreas takes us to the port town of Skien in Eastern Norway, where he uses recipes from the 19th century to honor Norway's most important playwright, Henrik Ibsen. |
| S11E13 | Tina's French Pantry | Tina Nordström | France | Tina travels to France, and combines Scandinavian and French ingredients to make spectacular seafood - mouthwatering oysters and mussels with herbs and cognac. |

=== Season 12 (US Season 6) (2015) ===
There were 9 episodes produced in this season, all of which were hosted by Andreas Viestad. The focus of this season was Norway.

| Episode Number | Episode Title | Hosts | Countries Visited | Description |
|---|---|---|---|---|
| S12E01 | Pale Fish | Andreas Viestad | Norway | Andreas visits the small community of Bulandet, a group of wind-blown islands in Western Norway. He goes fishing after saithe, summers most delicious fish. |
| S12E02 | A Traveller's Bite | Andreas Viestad | Norway | Andreas travels by train through the mountainous heart of Norway, between Bergen and Oslo, and cooks a great variety of dishes along the way. |
| S12E03 | Norwegian Versions of Classic Recipes | Andreas Viestad | Norway | Andreas travels through Norway's biggest national park and the beautiful Gudbrand's valley in Western Norway as he investigates traditional recipes |
| S12E04 | A Journey to the North | Andreas Viestad | Norway | Andreas travels north across the Arctic Circle on the train from Trondheim to Bodø. He goes fishing in the Queen of Rivers, and in the north Andreas makes reindeer meatballs and Arctic beef. |
| S12E05 | Eat Like the Vikings | Andreas Viestad | Norway | Eat like the Vikings, Andreas travels by boat to visit the islands of Lofoten, where he prepares a traditional cod dish and roast beef ribs over an open fire. |
| S12E06 | Northern Sea Passage | Andreas Viestad | Norway | While Andreas travels north on the Norwegian Coastal Express, and along the way he investigates what the sea and land can offer for his cooking. |
| S12E07 | Food for a Polar Expedition | Andreas Viestad | Norway | Onboard Hurtigruten Andreas goes on a polar expedition as he travels north along the beautiful and icy coastline of Norway. He visits the mountains of Northern Norway, where he cooks king crab, fit for activities and fun in the snow. |
| S12E08 | A Whole Salmon | Andreas Viestad | Norway | Andreas takes us to the island of Skrova in Northern Norway. The villages along the coast rely on fishing, and today traditional fishing coexists with modern aquaculture. |
| S12E09 | Happy Holiday Food | Andreas Viestad | Norway | Andreas makes a real Scandinavian Christmas feast, and shares all his favorite Norwegian recipes of the season. |

=== Season 13 (US Season 7) (2016) ===
There were 6 episodes produced in this season, all of which were hosted by Andreas Viestad. The focus of this season was Norway.

| Episode Number | Episode Title | Hosts | Countries Visited | Description |
|---|---|---|---|---|
| S13E01 | New Nordic Cuisine | Andreas Viestad | Norway | Andreas embarks on a culinary journey, looking for the source of the new Nordic food revolution. The journey begins in Oslo, at Norway's best restaurant, Maaemo before he continues southwards on his journey. |
| S13E02 | Very Local Stews | Andreas Viestad | Norway | Andreas prepares hearty stews as he travels southwards from Trondheim to Oslo. Stews are generous and at the same time they are often a great expression of unique local traditions. |
| S13E03 | Innovative and Old Fashioned | Andreas Viestad | Norway | Andreas visits the UNESCO-listed mountain town of Røros, and he investigates how this isolated town has become a culinary attraction. |
| S13E04 | Plenty of Foods | Andreas Viestad | Norway | Andreas visits Brumunddal in Ringsaker and investigates the great variety of inland Norway, the most productive farmland in the country. |
| S13E05 | Arctic Food | Andreas Viestad | Norway | Andreas visits Spitsbergen, the Norwegian settlement at 78 degrees north. In spite of the perpetual cold, and barren surroundings, the area is home to some of the world's richest fisheries. |
| S13E06 | Historical Garden | Andreas Viestad | Norway | Some of Scandinavia's grandest farms can be found around Norway's largest lake, Mjøsa. Andreas visits one of them, Hovelsrud, where he combines innovation, tradition and world class vegetables. |

=== Season 14 (US Season 8) (2018) ===
There were 8 episodes produced in this season, all of which were hosted by Swedish chef Niklas Ekstedt. The format of the show changed slightly with more upbeat graphics and music. Otherwise the show is mostly the same as before. The focus of this season was primarily in Norway.

| Episode Number | Episode Title | Hosts | Countries Visited | Description |
|---|---|---|---|---|
| S14E01 | Stockfish and Amber | Niklas Ekstedt | Norway | Niklas visits Lofoten, an archipelago in northern Norway known for its dramatic scenery, where he goes fishing for cod and cooks inspiring recipes. |
| S14E02 | Burning Water & Melted Butter | Niklas Ekstedt | Norway | Niklas travels by horse sleigh into the mountainous region of Roros and enjoys culinary treats. |
| S14E03 | Flavor of Roasted Coffee | Niklas Ekstedt | Brazil | Niklas investigates the most popular drink in Scandinavia, namely coffee, and travels to Brazil. |
| S14E04 | Arctic Fire | Niklas Ekstedt | Norway | The island of Kjollefjord in Finnmark County, Norway, is home to some of the world's richest fisheries; fishing for haddock with three generations of fishermen. |
| S14E05 | Hay Smoked Salmon | Niklas Ekstedt | Norway | The island of Lovund in Northern Norway; diving for scallops; a salmon dish touched by smoke, Viking style. |
| S14E06 | Campfire Fish | Niklas Ekstedt | Norway | Exploring the great variety of produce from farmland in Eastern Norway; fishing for perch; enjoying good food by the campfire. |
| S14E07 | Roasted Coastal Lamb & Dried Kelp | Niklas Ekstedt | Norway | Austevoll, an island just outside Bergen in Western Norway; the best produce of the season; coastal lamb and lobster. |
| S14E08 | Burning Sweet Desire | Niklas Ekstedt | Sweden, Columbia, Costa Rica | Host Niklas Ekstedt makes sweet buns at his restaurant in Stockholm; coffee and food traditions of South America. |

=== Season 15 (US Season 9) (2019) ===
There were 10 episodes produced in this season. The first 9 episodes were hosted by Andreas Viestad, with the last episode hosted by chef Ida Gran-Jansen. The focus of this season was primarily in Norway.

| Episode Number | Episode Title | Hosts | Countries Visited | Description |
|---|---|---|---|---|
| S15E01 | Flavors of the Eternal Forest | Andreas Viestad | Norway | In autumn, the Scandinavian forest is full of berries, mushrooms and wild game. |
| S15E02 | King Crab Hotel | Andreas Viestad | Norway | Andreas visits the municipality of Nes, where combine harvesters roam Eastern Norway. |
| S15E03 | Fairytale Land | Andreas Viestad | Norway | Andreas travels to Ringerike in Eastern Norway, the land of fairytales and historic farms. |
| S15E04 | Packed School Lunch | Andreas Viestad | Norway | Andreas heads to Gello in Eastern Norway to investigate the typical packed lunch matpakke. |
| S15E05 | Southern Ways | Andreas Viestad | Norway | Andreas visits Cardamom in Kristiansand, Southern Norway to cook with foraged ingredients. |
| S15E06 | Southwards Along the Coast | Andreas Viestad | Norway, Denmark | Andreas travels along the coast of Western Norway, before continuing to Denmark. |
| S15E07 | Danish Influences | Andreas Viestad | Denmark, Norway | Andreas joins a pack of hunters in Aalborg, Northern Denmark, and crosses over to Norway. |
| S15E08 | A Treat for the Holidays | Andreas Viestad | Norway | Andreas visits Savalen in Eastern Norway, where he makes some of his Christmas favorites. |
| S15E09 | Grain for Food | Andreas Viestad | Norway | Andreas visits Sokna in Eastern Norway - where wheat, barley and rye are all grown. |
| S15E10 | Island Treats | Ida Gran-Jansen | Norway | Guest host and chef Ida Gran-Jansen visits rich fishing grounds on Norway's west coast. |

=== Season 16 (US Season 10) (2024) ===
There were 9 episodes produced in this season, all of which were hosted by Christer Rødseth. Christer was announced as the new host in 2020, but due to the global COVID-19 pandemic new episodes were not produced and did not air until 2024.

| Episode Number | Episode Title | Hosts | Countries Visited | Description |
|---|---|---|---|---|
| S16E01 | Stone Upon Stone | Christer Rødseth | Norway | Chef Christer travels to Balme in Eastern Norway and cooks with a handmade stone oven. |
| S16E02 | South Sami Delicacies | Christer Rødseth | Norway | Christer ventures into Majavatn, the heart of the Sami People's cuisine and culture. |
| S16E03 | Autumn Apple Treats | Christer Rødseth | Norway | In Hardanger, Norway's apple country, Christer tastes local ciders and bakes apple cake. |
| S16E04 | City of Gastronomy | Christer Rødseth | Norway | Christer samples Trondheim's finest local produce and visits the iconic Britannia Hotel. |
| S16E05 | Sami Cuisine | Christer Rødseth | Norway | Christer visits Finnmarksvidda plateau for the Sami people's rich food traditions. |
| S16E06 | A Coastal Feast | Christer Rødseth | Norway | Chef Christer ventures through Afjord municipality on the Fosen Peninsula in Mid-Norway. |
| S16E07 | A Flavor of History | Christer Rødseth | Norway | Chef Christer explores Eastern Norway's rich cultural, culinary, and naval history. |
| S16E08 | A World of Flavors | Christer Rødseth | Norway, Chile | Join Chef Christer for a feast on an exciting culinary journey from Norway to Chile. |
| S16E09 | Plenty of Salmon | Christer Rødseth | Norway | Christer creates dishes utilizing the exceptional seafood from the Island of Frøya. |
