= Per Meland =

Norwegian businessman

Per Meland (born Per Gunnar Meland, March 12, 1972) is a Norwegian businessman and media entrepreneur. Meland has co-founded several companies within media, publishing and technology. He has also directed documentaries, and owns an award-winning restaurant.

== Business ventures ==
In 1999 he founded Face2Face an advertising and communications agency, headquartered in Oslo, Norway. The agency has around 200 employees with offices in Norway and Stockholm. Face2Face works with field marketing and creative campaigns. The company works with several leading international brands such as Santander Consumer Bank (Norway), American Express, SAS, Shell, Puma, BlackBerry and Telenor in the Nordic region. The company specializes in strategic communications between businesses and their end users, face to face. Usually through "under the radar"-channels like field marketing, word-of-mouth marketing and social media.

In 2007 Meland sold Face2Face to the venture capital company Idékapital AS, where he subsequently joined as one of four equal partners.

Following Meland's entry, Idékapital bought shares in:

- StormGeo (former Storm Weather Center), which Idékapital later sold for a reported 200 million NOK (35 million USD).
- Viken Fibernet (later Altibox) was cofounded by Idékapital. It was sold for a reported 400 million NOK (75 million USD) to Lyse Energi in 2009.
- Online Media Group. Meland sold his shares for an undisclosed amount to a group of employees in 2012.
- GeoKnowledge. A software company specialized in delivering exploration decision-support solutions for the oil and gas industry. It was sold to Schlumberger in December 2012 for an undisclosed amount.
- Gametainment. It was sold for an undisclosed amount in 2012.

In 2012 Meland left Idekapital, bought back Face2Face for an undisclosed amount and rejoined the management of the company.

== Boards ==
As of March 2013 Meland holds directorships on several boards:

- Face2Face: Chairman since 1999. A communication/advertising agency.
- Face2face AB: Chairman since 2011. A Swedish subsidiary of Face2face AS.
- St. Lars restaurant: Director of the Board since 2010. A Norwegian restaurant.
- Le Monde Diplomatique Norway AS: Director of the Board since 2010.
- Kagge Forlag AS: Director of the Board since 2009. Norwegian book publishing company owned by polar explorer Erling Kagge.
- Fiber Fox AS: Director of the Board since 2013. Promotional company for fiber based net solutions.
- Anniehall AS: Director of the Board since 2005. Meland's private holding company.

In addition Meland owns a stake in Dype Skoger AS which makes documentaries and publishes the Norwegian soccer magazine Josimar.

== Media, documentary and restaurant ==
- Soccer magazine: Through the media company Dype Skoger AS (Deep Woods) of which he owns 15%, Meland publishes Norway's premier monthly soccer magazine Josimar, which was voted "magazine of the year" by the Norwegian Editors Association in 2010.
- Monthly newspaper: Through his invest company Anniehall AS, Meland owns a 33.3% share in the Norwegian edition of Le Monde Diplomatique, a monthly newspaper offering analysis and opinion on politics, culture, and current affairs.
- Documentary: In 2007 Meland initiated and directed the documentary "When the sources are paid" ("Når kildene får betalt") that documented how parts of Norwegian media would pay for their sources in order to get stories. The documentary caused a lot of controversy and initiated a broad debate within Norwegian media about the subject. He revealed how the Norwegian criminal Ole Christian Bach financed being on the run from the Norwegian police by selling exclusive news items and interviews to journalists.
- Award-winning restaurant: Together with Tor Erik Hermansen of Stargate (production team) and the Norwegian food columnist and TV chef Andreas Viestad, Meland owns the critically acclaimed grill place St. Lars restaurant which according to an article in Norwegian newspaper Dagbladet is frequented by notables such as Queen Sonja of Norway and the Norwegian prime minister Jens Stoltenberg. The restaurant serves meat from both horse and bear. Was voted "restaurant of the year" by Natt & Dag in 2012.
