= Vodka From the Top of the World =

Vodka From the Top of the World was an advertising campaign created by Finnish National Distillers, Inc. to better sell their Finlandia Vodka in the early 1990s. With this slogan and campaign, Finlandia became one of the more popular imported vodkas in the United States.

== Overview ==
Although liquor sales have been declining for many years, the imported vodka sector remained a main staple of the industry. But in 1991 even figures for this segment decreased by almost six percent. Lagging far on behind the leading brands, Absolut and Stolichnaya, Finlandia Vodka wanted to increase its share of the market. Following the "Vodka at the Top of the World" campaign, created by Goodby, Silverstein, and Partners of San Francisco for Finnish National Distillers, Inc., Finlandia's sales volume grew by 6.2 percent in 1993, while Absolut and Stolichnaya decreased or stayed the same. In major markets, the number of people who tried Finlandia Vodka increased by twenty percent, and the campaign helped create a positive attitude toward the brand. Finlandia improved on its position in the market in spite of being outspent five to one by Absolut and two to one by Stolichnaya.

== Historical context ==
Finlandia Vodka is the product of a Finnish company, which used the name Finnish National Distillers in the United States. The vodka was first produced in 1970, and was launched in the U.S. market the following year. By the end of the 1990s, Finlandia was available in more than 100 countries, having enjoyed consistent growth globally. The company's efforts to increase sales in the U.S., however, were not quite as successful.

== Target market ==
Members of the target demographics were somewhat unusual in that they had little brand loyalty. Because vodka was primarily mixed with other drinks, brand was not seen to be incredibly important. Goodby, Silverstein, and Partners, however, found that if a consumer wanted a certain drink, such as ‘an Absolut martini,’ he or she would ask for a particular brand. But the brand varied on the event and the brand's image and how the drinker wanted to be perceived. Goodby called the phenomenon "import grazing" or "vodka promiscuity." Unfortunately for Finlandia, before the 1990s, the only brands with clear images were Absolut and Stolichnaya.

== Marketing strategy ==
Even though Finlandia's marketing budget for 1992 increased by only three percent, the company wanted to focus on an integrated marketing program that included a new ad campaign. The company's aim was to return its market share on imported vodka and then to increase it. Goodby, Silverstein, and Partners was brought in to create the new campaign. The agency's mission was to make Finlandia an important player in the imported segment of the vodka market, and it set out to do three things:

- Increase sales volume at a rate the same or better than Absolut and Stolichnaya
- Get more drinkers of imported vodka to try Finlandia
- Develop positive attitudes toward the product

Goodby, Berlin, and Silverstein interviewed barmen and ‘fashion-leader drinkers’ in swanky bars in Los Angeles, San Francisco, Chicago, and New York City to find out which vodka they drank. Although members of the target groups requested Absolut Vodka or Stolichnaya in the past, they did not feel that these brands were as distinct from each other as they once were. Many interviewees believed that Absolut was ‘style with no substance,’ and that Stolichnaya was ‘communicated substance with no style.’ Thus, the agency's marketing strategy became clear: advertise a vodka with both style and substance. This campaign began with the attempt to make people think of Finlandia and Finland as a sort of mythical place, where the finest vodka was created. This led to the references in Finlandia advertisements to the "Top of the World," a cold and frozen world of ice and snow that was the "realm of unique, intellectual people with a dry sense of humor and approach to life."

The color blue and a suggestion of coldness were used in print ads. Scenes in Finland were depicted with hardy and creative men and women braving various odds in order to drink their Finlandia vodka with each other. For the campaign, Goodby, Silverstein, and Partners used a variety of media, including trade and professional publications, consumer magazines, point-of-purchase displays, sales promotions, and direct mail advertisements. The agency's strategy did not include television ads. Ads were created for national media outlets, as well as regional publications in the major cities that the agency had conducted research before, large markets for imported vodka.

== Outcome ==
Goodby, Berlin, and Silverstein met its goals in the "Top of the World" campaign. First, Finlandia's sales volume grew in 1992 more than Absolut and Stolichnaya. This occurred despite the fact that Finlandia was outspent by both other brands. More drinkers began to try Finlandia. From 1991 to 1993, the brand's "awareness to trial" ratio rose twenty percent in targeted markets and ten percent nationally. Finlandia also succeeded in created a more positive image for their brand, with their reputation improving among drinkers as a result of this campaign.
