= Tina Nordström =

Swedish celebrity chef and television personality

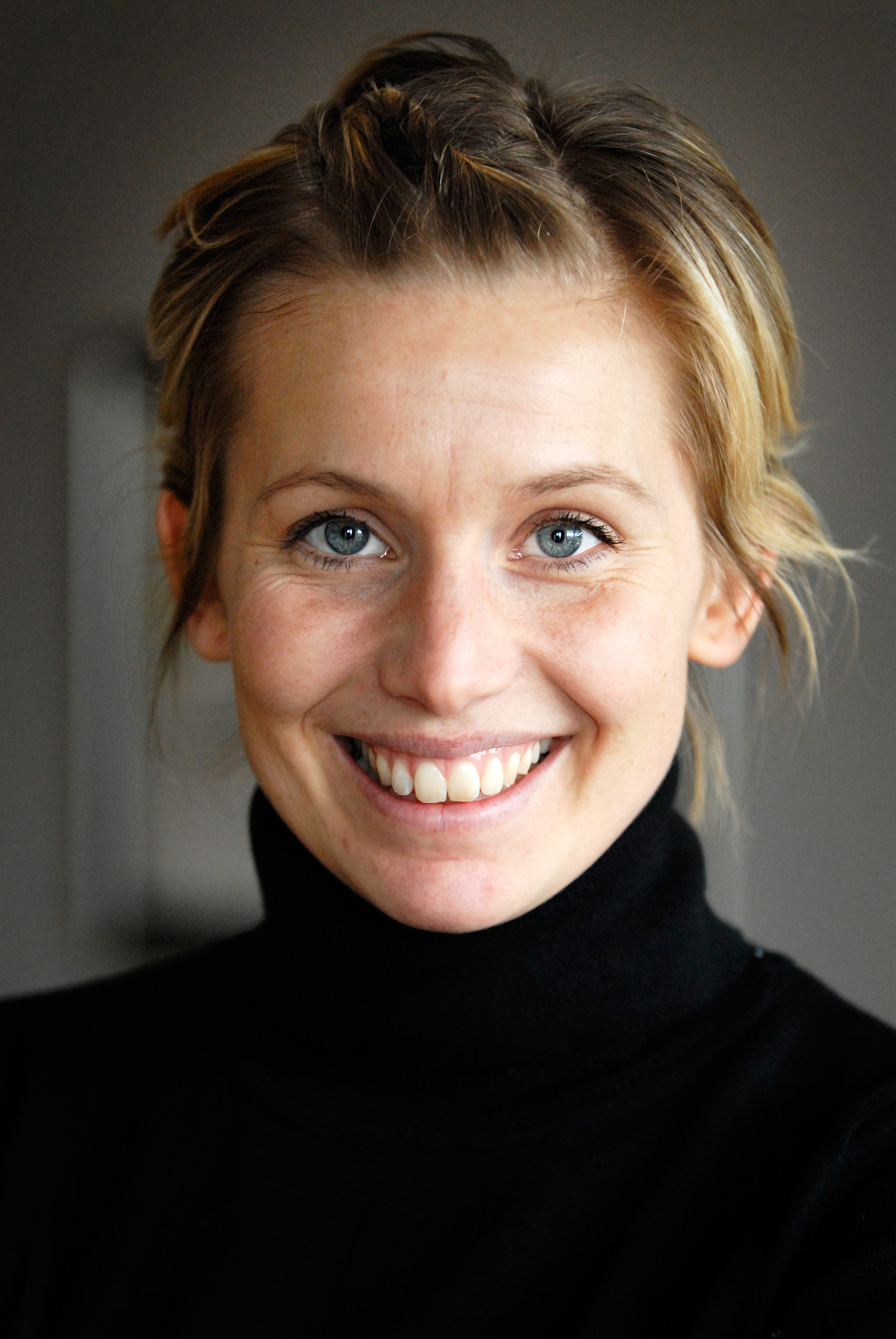
- Tina Nordström
- Born: 6 August 1973 (age 52); Välluv, Sweden
- Occupation: chef

Maria Kristina "Tina" Nordström Holmqvist (born 6 August 1973) is a Swedish celebrity chef and television personality from Helsingborg, Sweden. She hosted the second season of New Scandinavian Cooking on PBS stations on American television, replacing Andreas Viestad as host of the show; she was succeeded by Claus Meyer. She also appeared in a subsequent series featuring the same cast in rotation called "Perfect Day", produced by Tellusworks/Anagram Produktion and directed by Andreas Lindergard.

Besides the cookery show Mat ("Food"), which she made together with Tomas Tengby, she has written cookbooks—Tinas mat ("Tina's food"), Tina and Jättegott Tina ("Delicious, Tina").

Nordström won the Swedish Let's Dance television show in 2008, dancing with Tobias Karlsson. In 2009, she produced Tinas cookalong, with Gordon Ramsay as a guest cook.

From 2014, she is part of the jury in Sveriges yngsta mästerkock, the Swedish version of MasterChef Junior.
