= Niklas Ekstedt =

Swedish chef and restaurant manager

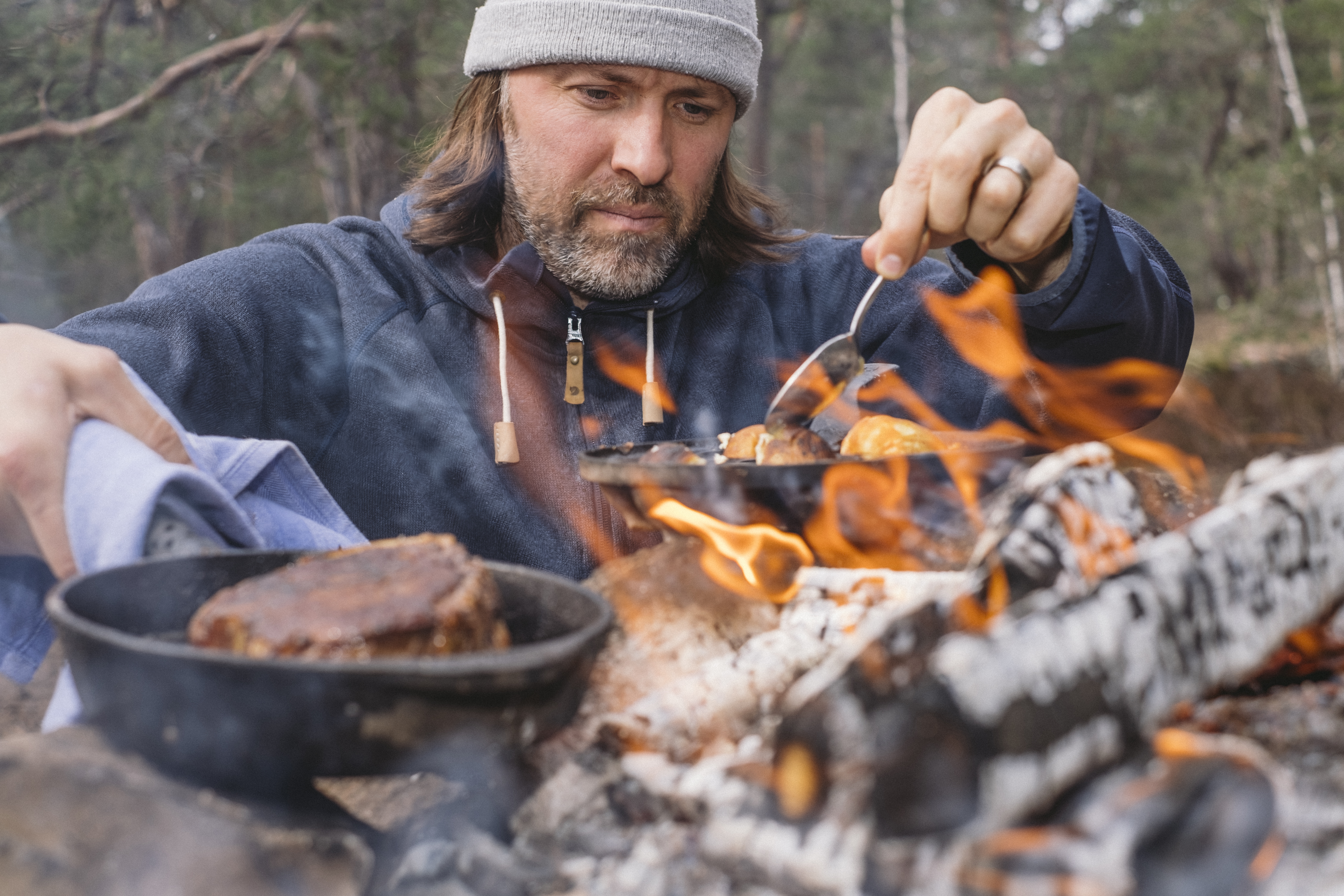
- Ekstedt in 2019
- Born: Niklas Peter Ekstedt; 28 November 1978 (age 47); Järpen, Sweden
- Occupation: Chef

Niklas Peter Ekstedt (born 28 November 1978) is a Swedish chef and restaurant manager.

After attending the gastronomic high school of Racklöfska in the skiing resort of Åre in central Sweden, Ekstedt worked for Charlie Trotter in Chicago.

Soon thereafter, at age twenty-one, Ekstedt started his first restaurant, 'Niklas', in the harbor town of Helsingborg, Sweden. Niklas was listed the best business restaurant in Sweden by newspaper 'Dagens Industri' in 2003 and the fifth best restaurant in Sweden by the restaurant guide 'White' in 2005.

In 2003 Ekstedt opened a second restaurant, 'Niklas i Viken', a summer restaurant located in the village of Viken, a few kilometers north of Helsingborg. Simultaneously, Ekstedt's cooking show, 'Mat' (Food in Swedish), began airing on Sveriges Television (Swedish national television).

In autumn 2008, Ekstedt and his staff moved to Stockholm to manage Restaurant 1900. In April 2009, the fifth season of Ekstedt's cooking show began airing. Since then Ekstedt's Television Career has continued with several shows, including a cooking show aimed at a children audience.

In 2011, Ekstedt opened his second restaurant in Stockholm, simply named 'Ekstedt'. Here, the concept is to first and foremost cook all raw ingredients over an open fire.

Ekstedt furthermore completed short internships at several three-star Michelin restaurants, including El Bulli, Spain.

In 2020, Ekstedt appeared as a judge in the Channel 4 series 'Crazy Delicious.' The show took place on an 'edible set' and was hosted by British comedian Jayde Adams alongside chefs Heston Blumenthal and Carla Hall.
