= Finlandia Vodka =

Finnish brand of vodka

Finlandia
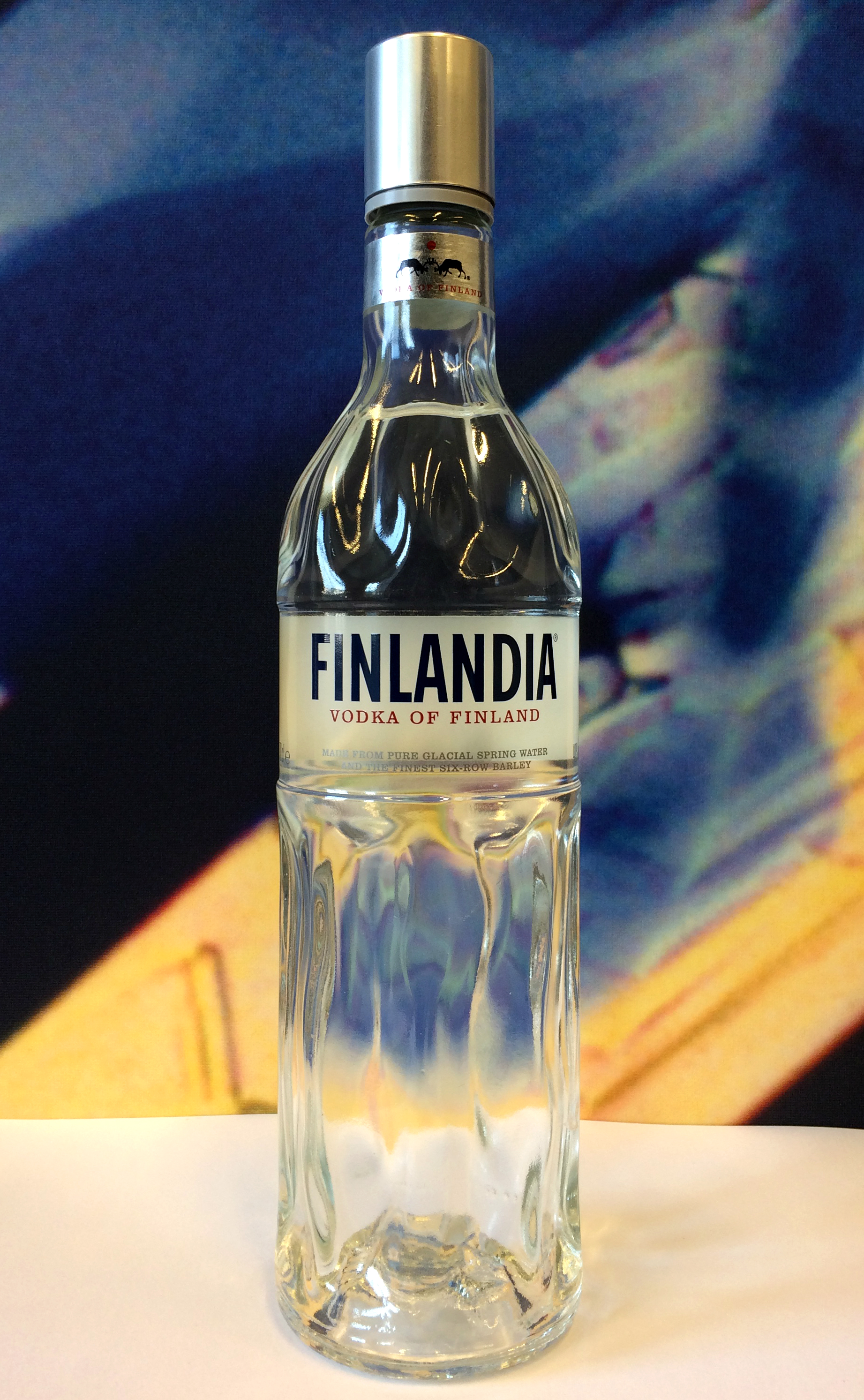
- Finlandia Classic vodka
- Type: Vodka
- Manufacturer: Coca-Cola HBC
- Origin: Finland
- Introduced: 1970
- Alcohol by volume: 37.5–40%
- Proof (US): 80
- Related products: List of vodkas
- Website: www.finlandia.com

Finlandia is a brand of vodka produced in Finland. It is made from barley distilled into a neutral spirit in the village of Koskenkorva in Ilmajoki by Finland's Altia Corporation. The distilled alcohol is then transported to a production facility in the village of Rajamäki in Nurmijärvi, about 45 kilometers (28 miles) north of Helsinki, where the spirit is blended with glacial water, flavored (except for the classic non-flavored edition, 101, and Platinum), and bottled.

The Finlandia brand was established in 1970 by Alko, Finland's state-owned alcoholic beverage company. It is now owned by Coca-Cola HBC.

Finlandia vodka is distributed in 135 countries and is widely associated with Finland on the international market. Flavors include cranberry (since 1994), lime (1999), mango (2004), red berry (2004), wild berries (2005), grapefruit (2006), tangerine (2009), and blackcurrant (2009).

== History ==
The distillery that produces Finlandia vodka was founded in 1888 by Dr. Wilhelm Juslin next to the glacial spring in the small Finnish village of Rajamäki in the Nurmijärvi parish. Today, a facility at that same historic location still manufactures and packages Finlandia.

In 1920, after the passage of the alcohol Prohibition Act in Finland, the Rajamäki distillery was bought by the Finnish state to secure an alcohol supply for pharmacies and for other non-beverage purposes. When the Prohibition Act was lifted in 1932, the state took over exclusive control of vodka production.

In 1970, Alko, the state-owned alcoholic beverage company, established the Finlandia vodka brand name. A year later the Finlandia brand became the first Nordic vodka sold in the United States, as well as the first imported vodka brand there classified in a premium category.

In 1975, a new alcoholic beverage plant was constructed at the Rajamäki location in Finland, and the distilling operation was centralized at the Koskenkorva facility in 1987.

In 2000, the listed U.S.-based Brown-Forman Corporation acquired 45% of Finlandia Vodka Worldwide, with the state-owned Altia Group, a successor of Alko's production division, retaining 55% ownership. Two years later Brown-Forman acquired an additional 35% stake in Finlandia Vodka. In 2004, Brown-Forman acquired the remaining 20% of Finlandia Vodka and assumed 100% ownership in the brand.

In 2016, Bloomberg reported Brown-Forman was considering a sale of Finlandia Vodka, which was not commented on by the company; however, the brand was not sold. In 2023, Coca-Cola HBC AG announced an agreement to acquire Brown-Forman Finland Oy, the owner of the Finlandia vodka brand, for $220 million, with the transaction completed later that year.

== Production ==
Finlandia vodka is produced from Finnish-grown six-row barley and pure glacial spring water.

At the Koskenkorva facility in western Finland, initial distillation of the fermented six-row barley takes place in seven columns with an average height of 25 meters using Altia's multi-pressure distilling system. Any remaining impurities, including lethal methanol as well as fusel alcohols and oils, are removed as the grain spirit is moved in a continuous process through more than 200 distillation steps. The entire production process, from grain mashing until the final neutral spirit flows out of the column, takes approximately 50 hours.

The final product, a grain spirit 96.5% by volume, is then transported about 315 kilometers (196 miles) south to the historic alcoholic beverage plant in the village of Rajamäki near Helsinki. The barley distillate is diluted with glacial water from the Rajamäki spring. Because the water is naturally filtered through sand and moraine formed by retreating glaciers during the Ice Age, no deionization, osmosis treatment or other artificial purification is used – unlike with some other vodkas.

The cooling and heating water used throughout the process is recirculated in a closed system to efficiently control temperature and keep water use to a minimum.

== Varieties ==
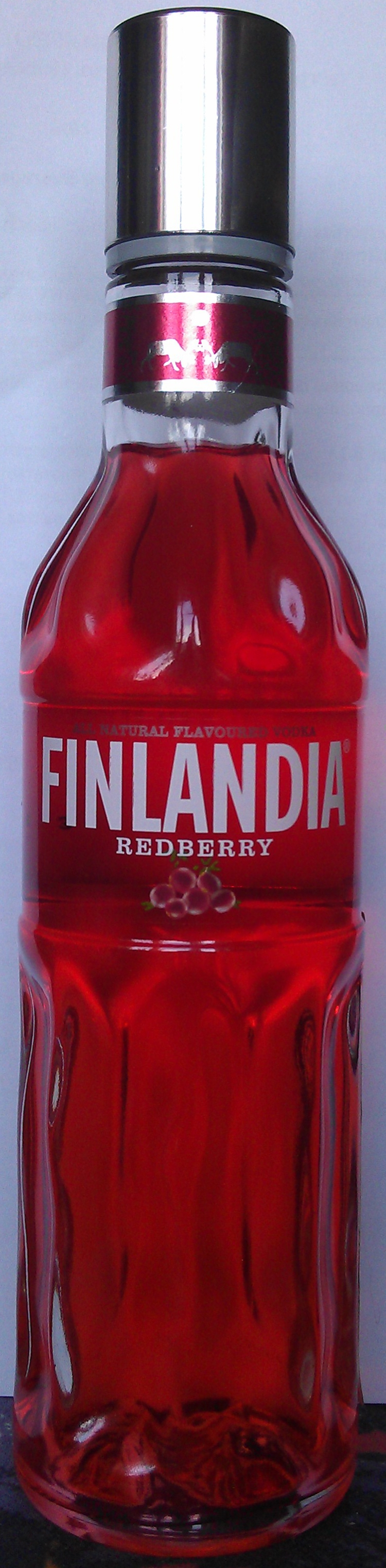
Finlandia Redberry

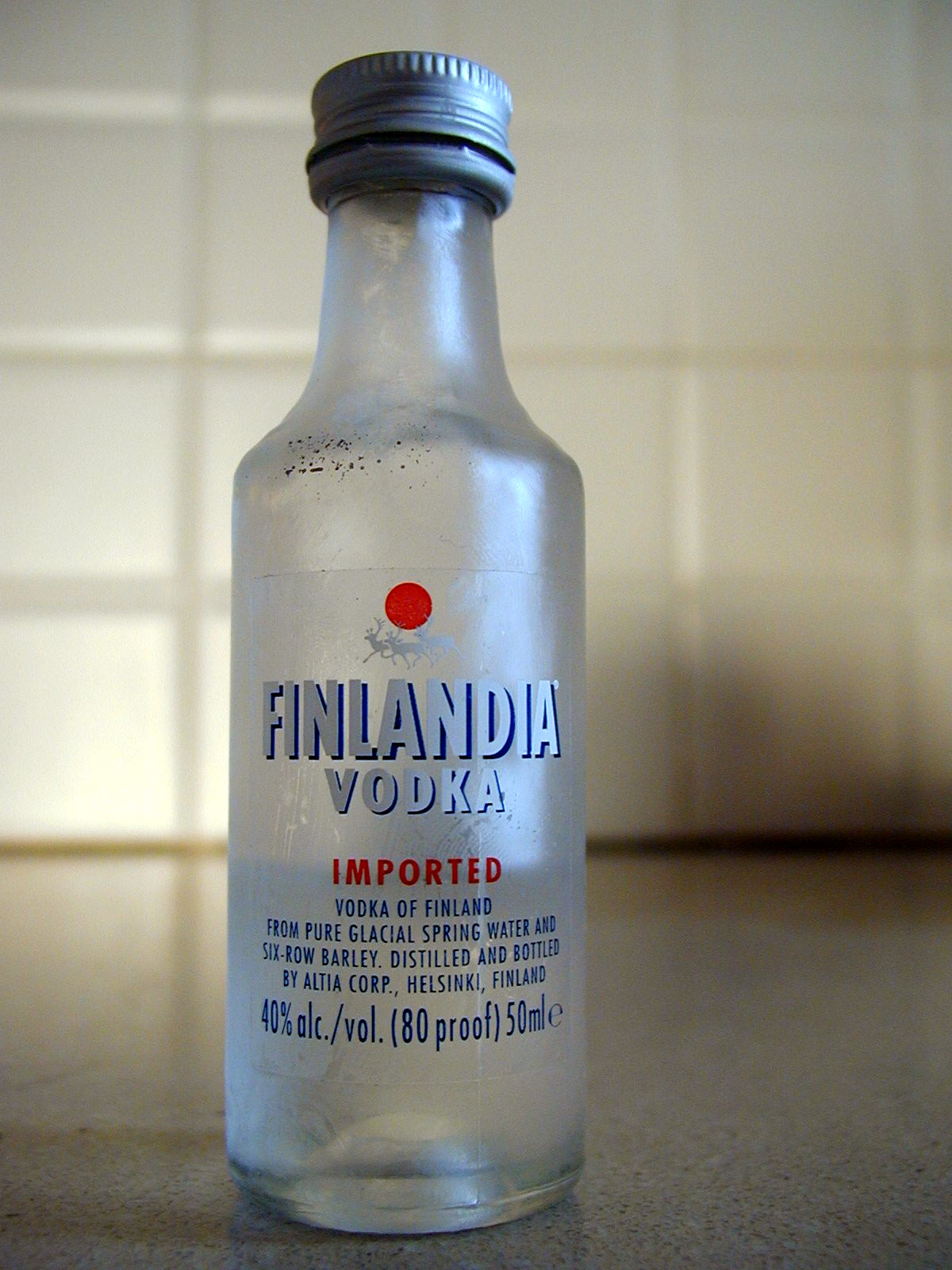
Finlandia Vodka 50 ml bottle

Finlandia is available in pure form (distilled alcohol + water) and in several flavored versions.

Name	Launched	Description
Finlandia Classic	1970	Pure vodka 40%, 80 proof alcohol
Finlandia Cranberry	1994	Cranberry flavored vodka
Finlandia Lime	1999	Lime flavored vodka
Finlandia Mango	2004	Mango flavored vodka
Finlandia Redberry	2004	Cranberry flavored vodka
Finlandia Grapefruit	2006	Grapefruit flavored vodka
Finlandia Blackcurrant	2009	Blackcurrant flavored vodka
Finlandia Tangerine	2009	Tangerine flavored vodka
Finlandia Raspberry	2011	Raspberry flavored vodka
Finlandia 101	2011	Pure vodka 50.5%, 101 proof alcohol
Finlandia Platinum	2011	Pure vodka 40%, 80 proof alcohol in a limited edition. Same water, spirit and distillation as Finlandia Classic. The difference is in the recipe and birch-wood softening. Produced by hand in small limited batches; each bottle numbered.
Finlandia Coconut	2014	Coconut flavored vodka
Finlandia Nordic Berries	2015	Lingonberries, cloudberries, and bilberries flavored vodka

== Finlandia promotion ==
During the past several decades, the marketing of Finlandia vodka has involved a number of global promotional campaigns.

- 1976–1985 Several advertising campaigns in which taste is the primary focus: "There are vodkas for orange juice lovers and tomato juice lovers. Now a vodka for vodka lovers" (1976). "The vodka for vodka purists" (1977). "Vodka for vodka drinkers" (1982). "Finlandia Vodka for vodka lovers" (1983). "The world's finest vodka. Over ice" (1984–85).
- 1990 The campaign "Finlandia. Vodka From the Top of the World" stresses the properties appreciated by vodka drinkers: coldness, clarity, and purity. The campaign was reintroduced in 2006.
- 1998 The campaign "In a past life I was pure, glacial spring water" is launched under the umbrella theme "Past Lives" in which Finlandia vodka recalls its glacial origins. The ad series evokes a sense of the past through grainy photos and personalities speaking about their past lives.
- 1999 The campaign "Refresh" captures Finlandia vodka as "purely refreshing".
- 2002 Finlandia appears as "The Official Vodka of James Bond" for "007 Die Another Day", the James Bond film series.
- 2005 The campaign "Vodka from a Purer Place" declares Finlandia to be "naked vodka" by playing up its Finnish heritage and the "pure glacial spring water" from which it is made. Transparent bottles are posed against snowy landscapes under headlines like "Here you see exactly what you're made of" and "When you have nothing to hide behind, you tend not to hide anything".
- 2013 The campaign "To the life less ordinary" is designed to illustrate that, due to its blend of 6-row barley, glacial water, and the midnight sun process, Finlandia is a "less ordinary vodka" produced in a less ordinary fashion. The campaign is meant to inspire viewers to never settle for the routine but instead always embrace a less ordinary life.

== Bottle design ==
Frozen Ice (1970) Tapio Wirkkala designed the original "Frozen Ice" bottle, which conveyed the impression of an ice-cold drink from Lapland in the Arctic North. The textured glass glittered like the surface of an icicle. The label featured two white reindeer sparring against the Midnight Sun low on the horizon.

Hammered Ice (1998) Hansen Design of Design Philadelphia introduced "Hammered Ice" bottle design. The paper label was dropped and replaced with lacquered text.

Glacial Ice (2003) Harri Koskinen, Finnish tabletop glass and industrial designer, along with New York's Wallace Church & Co. graphic designers and the Finlandia Global package design team, designed and launched the "Glacial Ice" bottle. The texture mimicked the sensation of melting ice, capturing the origins of the brand's glacial spring water.

Melting Ice (2011) Finlandia introduced a new bottle called "Melting Ice". The bottle was developed through the collective effort of designers including Harri Koskinen, the Finnish designer who was instrumental in the development of the prior Finlandia bottle, and Kenneth Hirst, an industrial designer based in New York, who sculpted the new form.
