= Andreas Viestad =

Norwegian food columnist and TV chef (born 1973)

- Born: 5 April 1973 (age 53); Oslo, Norway
- Education: University of Oslo
- Occupations: writer and chef
- Television: New Scandinavian Cooking
- Spouse: Vibeke Maria Viestad
- Children: 3

Andreas Viestad (born 5 April 1973, Oslo) is a Norwegian food columnist and TV chef, restaurateur, and activist. He has hosted ten seasons of New Scandinavian Cooking broadcast in the U.S., China, Germany, Italy, Finland, and on BBC Food, as well as over fifty other countries since 2003, and has been food writer for various newspapers in Norway in addition to a columnist in The Washington Post, titled "The Gastronomer". Viestad has been called "Norway's most exciting food writer", and "Norway's culinary ambassador". He is a restaurateur behind the Oslo restaurants St Lars, Salome and Spaghetteria, and creative partner for Ambassaden, a multi-restaurant project in the former US embassy in Oslo, a landmark building designed by Eero Saarinen. He is the founder of Geitmyra Culinary Center for Children in Oslo, Ringsaker, Kristiansand, and Tønsberg that works to promote what Viestad terms "Culinary Literacy".

== Career ==
Viestad has a cand.mag. degree from the University of Oslo. As his academic background is studies in history, political science and media science, his stated culinary qualification is an all-consuming preoccupation with food, where research is as likely to be conducted in a library as a laboratory or a kitchen. He frequently emphasises that he is not a trained chef, but an enthusiastic home cook with a special interest in the history and cultural context of food.

From 1995 to 1997, Viestad wrote for Morgenbladet, between 1997 and 1998 for Dagsavisen, and has been with Dagbladet since 1998. His weekly column in the Dagbladet weekend supplement Magasinet titled "Det beste jeg vet" began in 1999, initiating his collaboration with photographer Mette Randem of critical acclaim.

Viestad has been involved with the molecular gastronomy movement since 1999, working especially with French food scientist Hervé This at the Collège de France in Paris, and was a member of the International Workshop for Molecular Gastronomy, where he has participated with food scientists, such as Harold McGee, and Peter Barham and chefs Heston Blumenthal and Pierre Gagnaire. In his popular Washington Post column "The Gastronomer" that ran from 2008 to 2012, he wrote about the science of everyday cooking.

In 2003, Viestad premiered as the host of the public television series New Scandinavian Cooking. With 5 million U.S. viewers per episode and a global reach so vast it was, at the time, viewed as the greatest ever exposure of Norwegian culture, second only to the 1994 Lillehammer Olympics. As the host of seasons one, two, four, six, seven, eight, nine, ten, eleven, twelve and fourteen Viestad became internationally known. In 2008 the series included four hosts and was named Perfect Day, of which Viestad was a co-host.

On a visit to Zanzibar, hotelier Emerson Skeens offered Viestad the position of "consultant chef" at the Emerson Spice Hotel, which Viestad accepted. Though an unpaid position, Viestad has said, "One only gets to run a restaurant in Zanzibar once in a lifetime". His book Where Flavor Was Born: Recipes and Culinary Travels Along the Indian Ocean Spice Route (2007) was a departure from previous themes of Scandinavian cooking. The book was selected the "Best Foreign Cookbook in the World" at the Gourmand World Cookbook Awards in April 2008. His book on Norwegian food was awarded Special prize of the Jury at the 2009 Gourmand World Cookbook Awards. From 2008 to 2012, Viestad wrote a monthly column titled "The Gastronomer" for The Washington Post about the science of everyday cooking. Viestad's recipes and writing have also been published in Gourmet, The Sunday Times, Vanity Fair, Food & Wine and Vogue.

Viestad has stated that he admires food writers Jeffrey Steingarten and Nigel Slater, chefs Alice Waters and Pierre Gagnaire, and Norwegian chefs Eyvind Hellstrøm and Bent Stiansen. The food writers of the great London newspapers are his role models, as they "operate in the grey zone between food columns and consumer journalism. They cultivate the 'good language', and at the same time contribute to setting the agenda in society."

Viestad has become more and more involved with farming. He has a small farm in the hamlet of Viestad in the southern Norwegian town of Farsund, as well as an agricultural project in Elgin, near Cape Town, South Africa, named 'Garden of Elgin'. The project is run in collaboration with Dr. Paul Clüver on the Clüver family estate, and features 50 different citruses, more than 40 varieties of peaches, nectarines and apricots and a wide selection of herbs and vegetables, including more than 100 varieties of tomatoes. He also has a home in his birth town: Oslo.

Since 2010 Viestad has dedicated more and more time as an activist, and advocate for children's right to good food and proper culinary education. In 2011 he established Geitmyra matkultursenter for barn, a non-profit inspired by Alice Waters' Edible Schoolyard, which has educational programs for school children, along with courses and cultural activities. Since the opening in 2011, the center has expanded with three new centers, in Kristiansand, Ringsaker and Tønsberg. The center teaches children about cooking and growing food.

In 2011 Viestad opened his first restaurant, St. Lars, in Oslo in collaboration with Stargate producer Tor Erik Hermansen and businessman Per Meland where the cuisine is based on serving raw or grilled food with an emphasis on Norwegian produce and unusual cooking techniques. In 2020 he opened Salome with Norwegian chef and restaurateur Dag Tjersland, a venetian restaurant opposite Oslo's Opera house. In 2021 they opened Spaghetteria an informal pasta restaurant adjacent to Salome. Together with Fredensborg Hospitality he opened three new restaurants in the former US Embassy building in Central Oslo, designed by Eero Saarinen. The project features one of Norway's most comprehensive wine collections, opened in November 2023.

In 2020 he published a non-fiction book in food and history, Middag i Roma (Kagge forlag), published in English Books in 2022 as Dinner in Rome - A History of the World in One Meal by Reaktion Books and University of Chicago Press. The book is also published in Poland, Korea, India, Germany, Egypt, Romania, Spain and Denmark.

== Bibliography ==
- Bordet fanger - Kokkekunst for unge mennesker (1998)
- KOK (2000)
- Nord for Eden, Det beste jeg vet (2001)
- Kitchen of Light: The New Scandinavian Cooking (2003)
- Hvordan koke vann (2005)
- Mine beste sider (2006)
- Where Flavor Was Born: Recipes and Culinary Travels Along the Indian Ocean Spice Route (2007)
- Smak av krydder (2007)
- Reisen til Cadillac (2007)
- Norsk mat med Andreas Viestad (2008)
- Ekte mat (2010)
- På grillen (2012)
- Noe godt hver dag (2013)
- Julemat (2014)
- Den store kjøttkokeboka (2015)
- 90 retter du må kunne (2018)
- Familiemat (2018)
- Gårdsmat (2020)
- En middag i Roma (2020) / Dinner in Rome (2022)
