= Smoking by country =

Smoking is practiced in various countries. Smoking habits, prevalence, and customs may differ on a national level.

== List ==
- Smoking in Albania
- Smoking in Armenia
- Smoking in Argentina
- Smoking in Australia
- Smoking in Bahrain
- Smoking in Brazil
- Smoking in Canada
- Smoking in China
- Smoking in Colombia
- Smoking in Costa Rica
- Smoking in Cuba
- Smoking in the Czech Republic
- Smoking in Ecuador
- Smoking in Egypt
- Smoking in Ethiopia
- Smoking in Finland
- Smoking in France
- Smoking in Germany
- Smoking in Greece
- Smoking in Hungary
- Smoking in Oman
- Smoking in Iceland
- Smoking in Ireland
- Smoking in India
- Smoking in Indonesia
- Smoking in Iran
- Smoking in Iraq
- Smoking in Italy
- Smoking in Japan
- Smoking in Kuwait
- Smoking in Latvia
- Smoking in Malaysia
- Smoking in the Maldives
- Smoking in Mexico
- Smoking in New Zealand
- Smoking in Nigeria
- Smoking in North Korea
- Smoking in Norway
- Smoking in Pakistan
- Smoking in the Philippines
- Smoking in Russia
- Smoking in Saudi Arabia
- Smoking in Singapore
- Smoking in Sri Lanka
- Smoking in South Korea
- Smoking in Sweden
- Smoking in Syria
- Smoking in Taiwan
- Smoking in Timor-Leste
- Smoking in Tokelau
- Smoking in Turkey
- Smoking in Ukraine
- Smoking in the United Kingdom
- Smoking in the United States
- Smoking in Uruguay
- Smoking in Vietnam
