= Chainsmoker Cat =

Japanese manga series

- First tankōbon volume cover, featuring Yaniko Sato (above) and Oya Otani (below)

ヤニねこ (Yani Neko)
- Genre: Comedy; Slice of life
- Manga
- Written by: NyanNyanFactory (Note: A collective pen name used by three manga artists: Azuki Arai (荒井 小豆, Arai Azuki), Osato (おさとう), and Mikirō (みき郎).)
- Published by: Kodansha
- English publisher: NA: Seven Seas Entertainment
- Imprint: Young Magazine KC
- Magazine: Weekly Young Magazine
- Original run: February 20, 2023 – present
- Volumes: 14
- Anime television series
- Directed by: Taku Kimura
- Written by: Takashi Aoshima
- Music by: Keiichi Suzuki
- Studio: Bibury Animation Studios
- Licensed by: Netflix (streaming rights); OceanVeil (streaming rights); SEA: Medialink (former)
- Original network: Tokyo MX, BS11 (censored); AT-X (uncensored)
- Original run: July 3, 2026 – September 25, 2026
- Episodes: 12
- icon

Chainsmoker Cat (Japanese: ヤニねこ, Hepburn: Yani Neko) is a Japanese manga series written and illustrated by NyanNyanFactory. It has been serialized in Kodansha's seinen manga magazine Weekly Young Magazine since February 2023. An anime television series adaptation produced by Bibury Animation Studios aired from July to September 2026.

== Plot ==
Set in a modern-day world where human-animal hybrids, known as "beastfolk", co-exist with humans, the series follows the daily misadventures of catgirl Yaniko, a beastfolk who lives in a small apartment building in Nyagamihara (based on Sagamihara), Japan, and is addicted to smoking, regardless of the damage to her environment, her psyche, or her family. The series also features her interactions with her oddball neighbors, each with their respective issues, and their cranky human landlord who tolerates their antics.

== Characters ==
=== Main ===
Yaniko Sato (佐藤 ヤニ子, Satō Yaniko) / Yanineko (ヤニねこ) / Yanikasu (ヤニカス)
Voiced by: Yūko Natsuyoshi (Japanese); Rebecca Wang (English)
A freeter with a morbid addiction to cigarettes, but no financial literacy or everyday skills. Almost all the money Yaniko receives goes towards buying packs of cigarettes instead of essential needs, and when she cannot buy any, she often resorts to reusing spent cigarette butts or salvaging loose smokes off the street. Her need for nicotine often leads her into absurd and humiliating situations, and her attempts to quit never last long. She also likes to aggravate her landlord.
Oya Otani (大谷 おう也, Ōtani Ōya) / Landlord (大家, Ōya)
Voiced by: Tetsu Inada, Yui Tsukada (young) (Japanese); Michael Sorich (English)
The landlord of the apartment building where most of the main cast lives. Despite his intimidating appearance and gruff demeanor, he is a caring man, though he is often the victim of his tenants' actions. He has a dog-like sex doll in private, and he often experiences erections due to certain things happening while he is around female beastfolks.
Imoko Sato (佐藤 妹子, Satō Imoko)
Voiced by: Rina Honnizumi (Japanese); Reba Buhr (English)
Yaniko's younger sister who is a respected and responsible high school student. She often takes care of Yaniko's well-being despite her constant frustrations. She is also popular at school and has even been the subject of confessions.
Yakuko Etsushimaru (越司丸 益子, Etsushimaru Yakuko) / Yakuneko (ヤクねこ)
Voiced by: Misato Matsuoka (Japanese); Colleen O'Shaughnessey (English)
A beastfolk who has looked up to Yaniko as her senior since her high school days. Among all the residents of the apartment, she is the one Yaniko hangs out with most often. She secretly uses harder drugs in her apartment, including marijuana, though she always vehemently claims to be sober. It is also implied that she is an ex-convict. Despite this, Yakuko is much more social and well-adjusted in her life outside of her drug use.
Hameko Easygoing Anal Angel (ゆるふわアナル天使 ハメ子, Yurufuwa Anaru Tenshi Hameko) / Hameneko (ハメねこ)
Voiced by: Yurie Funato (Japanese); Lauren Landa (English)
Yakuko's high school classmate who is a gamer and runs a livestreaming channel, "Hame Channel". Born without a legal last name due to being a pure beastfolk, she decided to register "Easygoing*Angel" (ゆるふわ＊天使, Yurufuwa*Tenshi) as her last name. However, a city hall worker mistook the asterisk symbol for an anus, hence giving her a rather awkward last name. Hameko gets easily angered and flustered when things do not go her way, and has a tendency to urinate when stressed.
Kaoruko Nishi (西 薫子, Nishi Kaoruko) / Kansaineko (カンサイねこ)
Voiced by: Ayaka Shimizu (Japanese); Lauren Amante (English)
A college student, fellow smoker and amateur comedian from the Kansai region who is one of the more put-together members of the apartment building. While passionate about making others laugh, she lacks genuine talent in comedic delivery and her attempts at humor often lead to awkward reactions. Kaoruko speaks with Kinki dialect; in the English dub, she speaks with a Southern accent.
Aruko Sakai (酒井 アル子, Sakai Aruko) / Aruneko (アルねこ)
Voiced by: Shiori Izawa (Japanese); Victoria Grace (English)
Kaoruko's roommate, a fellow college student who is sometimes mistaken as a elementary school student due to her short stature. She is an alcoholic, spending most of the day drinking and sleeping in her room, to the point of affecting her academic performance. She also often wanders off to distant places when she drinks outside her home.
Saori Tatsuno (辰野 沙織, Tatsuno Saori) / Ochinpo Tatsuro (おちんぽ達郎) / Mankasu (マンカス)
Voiced by: Riko Akechi (Japanese); Chantelle Barry (English)
The only human resident in Oya's apartment building, as well as a fellow smoker. She works as a hentai manga artist under a pseudonym, though her manga does not sell well. Yaniko sometimes acts as her unofficial assistant.

=== Supporting ===
Yomuko Kaku (賀来 詠子, Kaku Yomuko) / Jikakineko (字書きねこ)
Voiced by: Niina Nakabayashi (Japanese); Natsuki Henderson (English)
Imoko's classmate who dreams of becoming a professional writer. She frequently visits the apartment building where she asks Saori and Yaniko for advice, though she often claims her work is written by her "friend" due to insecurity, and she spends more time on social media than she does with her creative writing.
Kazushi (カズシ)
Voiced by: Minoru Hirota (Japanese); Doug Stone (English)
The yakuza-esque editor-in-chief of Nyan Magazine, in which Saori's work is serialized. He has known Yaniko ever since she was a child, and sees her as a daughter.
Lani (ラニ, Rani)
Voiced by: Mariya Ise (Japanese); Sarah Natochenny (English)
The chief of Alpha Tribe, a local primordial beastfolk tribe that cultivates tobacco. She has two tails akin to that of a nekomata.
Nazuna Kujou (九条 ナズナ, Kujō Nazuna) / Penpenneko (ペンペンねこ)
Voiced by: Yū Kobayashi (Japanese); Kaitlyn Robrock (English)
A homeless beastfolk who lives in a tent near a river. Claiming to be one with nature and often speaking in an aloof, philosophical manner, she is very sensitive and emotional in private. After her original tent is swept away by a flood, she squats in the yard of Oya's apartment building. It is later revealed that she actually comes from a wealthy industrialist family, but she ran away to seek freedom.
Shizue Sato (佐藤 静江, Satō Shizue)
Voiced by: Yumi Hara (Japanese); Megan Shipman (English)
The widowed mother of Yaniko and Imoko. She herself is a chain smoker as well, though she manages to hide her habit from Imoko. Despite being Yaniko's mother, Yaniko still calls her by her given name.
Shunran Nishi (西 春蘭, Nishi Shunran)
Voiced by: Kentarō Mashiro (Japanese); Cedric Williams (English)
Kaoruko's younger brother who enjoys pranking others.

== Production ==
The members of the pen name group NyanNyanFactory first met on a Discord server. While talking about smoking, they came up with the idea of Yaniko as a character and found her concept funny. They hid their identities when they first met and began posting Chainsmoker Cat as a web manga on Twitter in November 2022, where it gained popularity among a niche audience. After being contacted by several manga magazines, NyanNyanFactory chose Kodansha's seinen manga magazine, Weekly Young Magazine, in part because of its high manuscript payouts.

== Media ==
=== Manga ===
Written and illustrated by NyanNyanFactory, Chainsmoker Cat started in Kodansha's seinen manga magazine Weekly Young Magazine on February 20, 2023. Kodansha has collected its chapters into individual tankōbon volumes, with the first one released on August 4, 2023. As of November 6, 2026, fourteen volumes have been released.

In February 2025, Seven Seas Entertainment announced that it had licensed the series for English publication, with the first volume released in December that same year.

==== Volumes ====
No.	Original release date	Original ISBN	English release date	English ISBN
1	August 4, 2023	978-4-06-532350-2	December 9, 2025	979-8-89561-435-8
2	November 6, 2023	978-4-06-533630-4	March 17, 2026	979-8-89561-436-5
3	February 6, 2024	978-4-06-534615-0	June 16, 2026	979-8-89561-437-2
4	May 7, 2024	978-4-06-535598-5	September 15, 2026	979-8-89561-438-9
5	August 6, 2024	978-4-06-536546-5	December 15, 2026	979-8-89561-439-6
6	November 6, 2024	978-4-06-537452-8	March 30, 2027	979-8-89765-594-6
7	February 6, 2025	978-4-06-538464-0	—	—
8	April 28, 2025	978-4-06-539491-5	—	—
9	August 6, 2025	978-4-06-540533-8	—	—
10	November 6, 2025	978-4-06-541400-2	—	—
11	February 6, 2026	978-4-06-542531-2	—	—
12	May 20, 2026	978-4-06-543541-0	—	—
13	August 6, 2026	978-4-06-544480-1	—	—
14	November 6, 2026	978-4-06-545496-1	—	—

=== Anime ===
An anime television series adaptation was announced on February 2, 2026. The series was produced by Bibury Animation Studios and directed by Taku Kimura, with Takashi Aoshima writing the scripts, Riki Matsuura designing the characters, and Keiichi Suzuki composing the music. It aired from July 3 to September 25, 2026, on Tokyo MX and BS11. (Note: Tokyo MX listed the series premiere on July 2 at 24:30, which is effectively July 3 at 12:30 a.m. JST.) The series was released in two versions: the clean "On-Air" version for terrestrial TV broadcast, and the uncensored "Evil Dragon Unleashed" version, which began airing on the premium TV channel AT-X on July 26, 2026, and was released on selected Japanese streaming platforms such as Netflix, Hulu, AnimeFesta, and Anime Times; the latter two carries both the clean and uncensored versions. The opening theme song is "Nanmonee" (なんもねえ; lit. 'Nothing at All'), performed by Wasureranneyo, while the ending theme song is "Kemuri to Blue" (煙とブルー; lit. 'Smoke and Blue'), performed by Necry Talkie. For episode 11, Necry Talkie and Wasureranneyo performed the covers of the theme songs. The episodes will be collected on a Blu-ray Disc box set, scheduled to release in 2027.

Netflix began streaming the series outside of Japan on July 2, 2026. OceanVeil is also streaming the series uncensored. Medialink initially licensed the series in Asia-Pacific for its Ani-One Asia YouTube channel. However, it was later pulled mid-season to "comply with local government regulations in relevant markets."

==== Episodes ====
No.	Title	Directed by	Storyboarded by	Original release date
1	"I'm the Chainsmoker Cat"; Transliteration: "Nyā ga Yani Neko Nya" (Japanese: ニャーがヤニねこにゃ)	Taku Kimura	Taku Kimura	July 3, 2026
Yaniko spills tar juice on herself and her landlord. Yaniko accidentally spills cigarettes from a new pack on the ground. Yaniko tries to work at a few part-time jobs but her chainsmoking angers her employers. Yaniko is forced to live on a few hundred yen and six cigarettes for a week. Yaniko calls her sister, Imoko. Yaniko uses multiple nicotine patches at once. Yaniko blows a smoke ring in the shape of a heart. Yaniko's smoke reminds the Landlord of his abusive father. Yaniko takes a bath and falls asleep naked, making herself sick. Imoko visits Yaniko's apartment in a hazmat suit to nurse her back to health. Yaniko has a nightmare about a doctor visit that makes her promise to quit smoking to Imoko, only to get inspired to smoke again by seeing the Milky Way.
2	"Meet My Juniors"; Transliteration: "Nyā no Kōhaitachi Nya" (Japanese: ニャーの後輩たちにゃ)	Kōsuke Hirota	Ryūhei Aoyagi	July 10, 2026
Yaniko has a hallucination of a talking cigarette while going through withdrawal. Yaniko bums a smoke off her neighbor, Yakuko, who insists she is smoking a normal cigarette. Yaniko walks in on Yakuko while she is injecting herself with an unknown substance. Yaniko and Yakuko come across a fortune-teller in an alleyway, who predicts that Yaniko only has five years left to live. Yakuko looks up to Yaniko, but is humbled when Yaniko later wakes her up to beg for cigarette money. Yaniko hangs out in Hameko's room, only for Hameko to get increasingly mad at both the game and her. Imoko gets embarrassed by her older sister while walking home from school with her friends. Hameko accidentally livestreams herself eating a bug. Yakuko remembers Hameko as the "Toilet Fairy" from high school while hanging out in Yaniko's room. Hameko visits the city hall to give herself an official surname, "Easygoing*Angel", and includes the asterisk on her submitted form, leading a confused clerk to interpret it as "Easygoing Anal Angel".
3	"I'm More of a Straight Man Than a Funny Man"; Transliteration: "Nyā wa Boke yori Tsukkomi-yori Nya" (Japanese: ニャーはボケよりツッコミ寄りにゃ)	Yusuke Kurinishi	Munenori Nawa	July 17, 2026
Yaniko plays soccer with some kids in the park only to be fined by police officers. Yaniko drops increasingly disgusting things on the Landlord's head, but goes too far when she slaps a pair of human-toxic nicotine patches on him. The Landlord tasks Yaniko with weeding the yard to disastrous results. Yaniko finds mysterious talismans in her room and hears ominous noises. Yaniko tries to ask the Landlord on its source, but the embarrassed Landlord, having been interrupted from his session with a sex doll, refuses to explain. Kaoruko attempts to make Yaniko laugh to no avail. Yaniko visits Aruko's room for a free drink. Aruko pukes in her sleep. Yaniko lets out a massive fart inside a broadcast van, which Kaoruko gleefully broadcasts. Yaniko gets stuck halfway through a wall trying to reach a dropped cigarette, and Kaoruko's efforts to free her get misinterpreted as public sex.
4	"Everyone Around Me Are Weirdos"; Transliteration: "Nyā no Mawari wa Henjin Bakari Nya" (Japanese: ニャーのまわりは変人ばかりにゃ)	Munenori Nawa	Munenori Nawa	July 24, 2026
Yaniko decides to finish her cigarette before saving a drowning child. Imoko sees a cigarette butt in her burger and is horrified, thinking Yaniko has been turned into a meat patty. In reality, Yaniko accidentally dropped her cigarettes into the food. Yaniko assists her manga artist neighbor, Mankasu, and accidentally burns through a page. A few days later, Yaniko models as a schoolgirl for Mankasu's erotic manga in public, but they are both arrested for suspicious activity. Mankasu gets Kaoruko as a replacement. At a mahjong parlor, intimidating chief editor of Nyan Magazine Kazushi and his bodyguards are turned on by Yaniko and Hameko. Aspiring writer Yomuko visits Yaniko to ask for advice on her novel. A rival gangster family shoots Kazushi at the office of Nyan Magazine to avenge an insult, but Kazushi survives thanks to hiding an issue of Afternyan with a Land of the Lustrous special insert under his robe. However, one of the bullets pierces through and delivers a near-fatal wound, until Yaniko's touch gives him the will to live. Hameko streams life around the apartment, but candid footage of its residents and the Landlord gets her Hame Channel suspended.
5	"We're Going to a Remote Place"; Transliteration: "Nyātachi Hikyō ni Iku Nya" (Japanese: ニャーたち秘境に行くにゃ)	Michiru Itabisashi	Chihiro Kumano	July 31, 2026
Imoko confiscates her sister's cigarettes. However, just as she starts to feel guilty, she walks in on Yaniko pulling out a fresh pack she hid in her stomach earlier. Imoko turns down a nice boy named Shu when he confesses his feelings for her. It is later implied that thanks to her sister, Imoko has a preference for those who need to be taken care of. Yakuko has a Pavlovian response to the number 12. The catgirls at the apartment play an old version of The Game of Life, from when beastfolk were more openly discriminated against. Yakuko goes hunting for stag beetles, in which only Yaniko has time to accompany her. Yakuko, Yaniko, and Hameko visit the Tobacco Village, home of the Alpha, an ancient beastfolk tribe that live in the mountains, run by Chief Lani. While Lani explains her tribe's history and customs, Yaniko insults her tribal tattoos. In response, Lani makes the trio jump off their tower while hanging by a vine. Hameko wets herself while falling, earning her the nickname of "Rainbow Maker". Imoko feels too self-conscious after catching a cicada with her catlike reflexes.
6	"My Summer Begins and Ends"; Transliteration: "Nyā no Natsu ga Hajimatte Owaru Nya" (Japanese: ニャーの夏が始まって終わるにゃ)	Kōsuke Hirota	Munenori Nawa	August 7, 2026
Yaniko takes creative measures to continue smoking through the night. Aruko chugs sake and wanders off from the party. She then takes a cab all the way to Enoshima until the Landlord and Yakuko track her down with a GPS device hidden in her hair and bring her back home. While hanging out in Aruko's room, the catgirls find all the things they planted in Aruko's massive hairdo until a lit cigarette sets her alcohol-soaked hair on fire. Yomuko asks Mankasu for advice on time management, but Mankasu notices she spends her time browsing "Nyax". A flashback shows the Landlord and Yakuko chatting with each other while tracking down Aruko. Mankasu gets frustrated with her new temp assistants while trying to hit a deadline. Penpenneko talks about living with nature and gets bitten by a black cat. Penpenneko later takes shelter from the storm in Yaniko's room, but rushes back outside when she sees her tent and belongings have been swept away in the Nyagami River. Yaniko smokes from a sparkler on the beach.
7	"I, Too, Was Born to Parents"; Transliteration: "Nyā mo Oya Kara Umareta Nya" (Japanese: ニャーも親から生まれたにゃ)	Mitsuhiro Yoneda	Mitsuhiro Yoneda	August 14, 2026
Yaniko unknowingly summons the Nicotine Demon while she is sleeping. However, he is so disgusted by her repulsive lifestyle that he returns home. Yaniko gets a temp job scrubbing old factory pipes and ignores the warning not to smoke after handling flammable materials, sparking a huge explosion. Yakuko returns after attending her grandfather's memorial service and suggests to Yaniko on visiting her family. Yaniko shares cigarettes with her mother, Shizue, who tries to hide her habit from Imoko even when the family goes out to see a movie. Imoko saves Aruko from stepping into traffic while she is distracted from her recent diagnosis. Aruko's tremors make the entire apartment building shake. The Landlord accidentally gets stuck outside while having another session with his sex doll, and has to rely on Mankasu to get back inside without anyone else seeing him. Yomuko visits Yaniko again to get feedback on her story. The Landlord offers solace to Penpenneko until a gust of wind lifts up her outfit, leading to the Landlord having an erection. Mankasu gets too excited while brushing Yaniko's hair and accidentally turns her bald.
8	"Even We Run Around in December"; Transliteration: "Nyātachi mo Shiwasu wa Hashiru Nya" (Japanese: ニャーたちも師走は走るにゃ)	Yamada Tsumugi	Momoko Natsuno	August 21, 2026
Yaniko celebrates her birthday alone, unaware her friends are throwing her a surprise party at a nearby bar, as no one remembered to invite her there. Hameko is visited by a catboy named Shunran, who pretends to be Kaoruko's lover, until Kaoruko herself steps in and reveals that Shunran is her younger brother. Kaoruko steps outside of a social gathering and chats with a classmate, soon getting embarrassed by a returning Yaniko. Yomuko expresses admiration for Mankasu after saving one of her manga pages. Yakuko and Kaoruko set up a smoking area out of snow while Yaniko sleeps. The drunken catgirls at the apartment play a prank on the Landlord. The Landlord hosts a mochitsuki at the apartment for the New Year, but gets stuck in a time loop where one of the catgirls somehow dies during the mochi pounding, until he takes drastic measures to break the loop, saving his tenants from death but getting himself arrested for indecent exposure. Kaoruko and Shunran visit their family's home for the holidays.
Special	"A Special Presentation featuring Yani Neko"; Transliteration: "Kyō Dake Kireina Yani Neko Tokuban" (Japanese: 今日だけキレイなヤニねこ特番)	N/A	N/A	August 28, 2026
A special program hosted by Yūko Natsuyoshi (Yaniko), Tetsu Inada (Landlord), and Tenshin Hantaro that provides a recap and some behind the scenes stories.
9	"My Little Sister is Popular"; Transliteration: "Nyā no Imōto-chan wa Motemote Nya" (Japanese: ニャーの妹ちゃんはモテモテにゃ)	Kōsuke Hirota & Shibuta Naoaki	Momoko Natsuno	September 4, 2026
Yaniko sets off the sprinkler system after she ignores a janitor's warning not to smoke in a public bathroom. Imoko's classmate, Ouji Ruko, wants to get closer to her. However, she gives Imoko a disgusting gift after getting vague hints from her friends. Yaniko tries to grab another smoke while she is not finished using the toilet. Kaoruko struggles to get a laugh from her friends again, and accidentally embarrasses herself in front of a visiting Imoko. A human family holds a "Beastfolk Funeral" for their deceased relative. Yakuko and Kaoruko go clothes shopping for Yaniko. Yakuko tests a hypnosis app on Yaniko to get her to stop smoking, but it works too well as a hypnotized Yaniko goes on a crusade against smoking. Imoko and Yomuko's class get their report cards, and the two later become friends when Imoko asks for Yomuko's help with writing assignments. Shizue indulges in chainsmoking while Imoko is out of the house. However, when Imoko comes home early, Shizue makes up a story about being burglarized, which backfires on her when Imoko swears she is never going to spend the night away ever again.
10	"I'm Gonna Enjoy the Event Too"; Transliteration: "Nyā mo Ibento o Tanoshimu Nya" (Japanese: ニャーもイベントを楽しむにゃ)	Masato Kamiyama	Mitsuhiro Yoneda & Kenji Takahashi	September 11, 2026
Shizue enjoys the smell of used cigarettes with Yaniko. Yakuko drives to the Suisha Waterfall with Hameko while Hameko livestreams the trip. An annoyed Yakuko accidentally speeds off without her. Hameko goes hitchhiking, but becomes aghast at a driver refusing to let her out until he takes pictures of her mouth. Yakuko soon returns to pick her up. Yaniko returns to the apartment building after a dog-walking job, and gives the Landlord a bag of dog poop, which he erroneously believes is Valentine's Day chocolate. Yaniko takes down a kite in revenge for it snatching her hot dog, but the Landlord pays her to let it go. He later fantasizes about the kite coming back in Beastfolk form to thank him. A burnt out Mankasu dresses up in a lewd magical girl outfit. The Landlord then shows up and is aroused when he sees her wearing cat ears. Penpenneko hangs out in Aruko's room while the latter is asleep. However, she is forced to hide on the ceiling when the Landlord walks in. After Yaniko and Kaoruko tell bad jokes to each other on April Fools' Day, Yaniko fakes a pregnancy with Shunran as the father to prank Imoko.
11	"We're in Kyoto"; Transliteration: "Nyātachi in Kyōto Nya" (Japanese: ニャーたち in 京都にゃ)	Michiru Itabisashi	Michiru Itabisashi	September 18, 2026
Shizue tries to smoke in a café that only allows e-cigarettes while Imoko is on a class trip to Kyoto. Imoko's friends come up with ideas to "improve" Kyoto while viewing the Nyankakuji Golden Pavilion. Meanwhile, Mankasu takes the other apartment residents to Kyoto. Mankasu draws consecutive bad fortunes at a temple while splurging on the trip. Elsewhere, the Landlord watches a ghost special on TV, and feeling lonely, sleeps with his sex doll. The next day, Imoko and Yomuko come across several discarded cigarette butts while taking a "tour of the anus" of the Cat Buddha, unaware that Yaniko's group already passed through earlier. Imoko's class learns about the relationship the Beastfolk had with humans in Japan during the Edo period, including the Boshin War. Mankasu's group visits Nara Park, as Yaniko meets an intelligent sika deer who explains own people's history. He then laments both the downfall of his people and how his intelligence is slowly slipping away. Mankasu finds out that her manga has been canceled while she is driving the group back to the apartment building, which causes her to flip the car. Once they return home, Mankasu goes stir-crazy without a steady job.
12	"Even in the Final Episode I'm Still Smoking Too"; Transliteration: "Nyā wa Saishū Kai demo Yani o Sū Nya" (Japanese: ニャーは最終回でもヤニを吸うにゃ)	Taku Kimura, Shin'ichirō Ushijima, & Kōtarō Matsunaga	Taku Kimura	September 25, 2026
Yaniko lazily kicks over a glass jar she used as an ashtray and then throws her spent cigarette out the window, burning the Landlord's head. An unemployed Mankasu feels self-conscious about buying a crepe. Yakuko has a breakdown after being fired from her last job. After losing an online match and being insulted by her opponent, Hameko becomes blinded by rage until Yakuko knocks her down. Mankasu talks with the Landlord about drawing a Beastfolk femboy for her next project, and gets Shunran to model her idea. The Landlord resists becoming aroused by Shunran's crossdressing but wavers after seeing him apply artificial breasts. After visiting her sister, Imoko comes across Aruko and starts taking care of her. When Kaoruko comes back home, Imoko mistakes her for Aruko's mother, and starts berating her. Yomuko models a bikini for Mankasu while asking for more writing advice, and later gets Mankasu in trouble when she steps outside while still wearing the bikini. Yaniko and the Landlord get in a fight after accusing each other of being lazy while everyone else watches. Yaniko accidentally mixes up her beer cans full of beer and ones full of cigarette butts.

== Reception ==
The series ranked 12th in the ninth Next Manga Award in the print category in 2023; it ranked 13th in the 2024 edition in the same category. The series ranked 18th in Takarajimasha's Kono Manga ga Sugoi! list of best manga of 2024 for male readers.

The anime ranked first on Niconico's Top 10 Summer 2026 Anime Mid-Season Ranking (counting period from July 1 to August 17). It ranked third on Netflix Japan's weekly ranking of July 6–12, 2026.

The anime series has been praised by Japanese creatives, including Makoto Shinkai, Tsutomu Mizushima, and Yukito Ayatsuji.

=== Bans and censorship ===
A viewer complaint about the anime was sent to the Japanese Broadcasting Ethics & Program Improvement Organization and examined on July 28, 2026. The committee member in charge deemed the anime to be within the bounds of freedom of expression. They reasoned that the late-night time slot demonstrated the creator's thoughtfulness and that it was unclear whether any characters used illegal drugs. Another member agreed, reasoning that the animated nature of the show would have a smaller negative impact than a live-action representation. One member expressed concern about a scene in which a character uses a syringe, stating that such depictions should be avoided during a time when illegal drug use is a social issue. However, the complaint did not move to debate.

Due to its depictions of "tobacco advertisements, including repeated clear displays of tobacco products and brand names", Hong Kong's Department of Health warned that the anime adaptation violated the Smoking (Public Health) Ordinance, which bans online ads for smoking products. Bahamut Animation Crazy, one of the platforms streaming the series in Hong Kong, complied with the order and suspended its broadcast on August 17, 2026. Medialink also announced the series would no longer be available to watch on its Ani-One Asia YouTube channel.

An official from Taiwan's Health Promotion Administration said images from the series might contravene the Tobacco Hazards Prevention Act, and the agency had asked local health departments to investigate the issue. On August 21, 2026, Health Minister Shih Chung-liang said the series failed to comply with the guidelines. Several local streaming platforms subsequently removed the series.
