= Health in Greece =

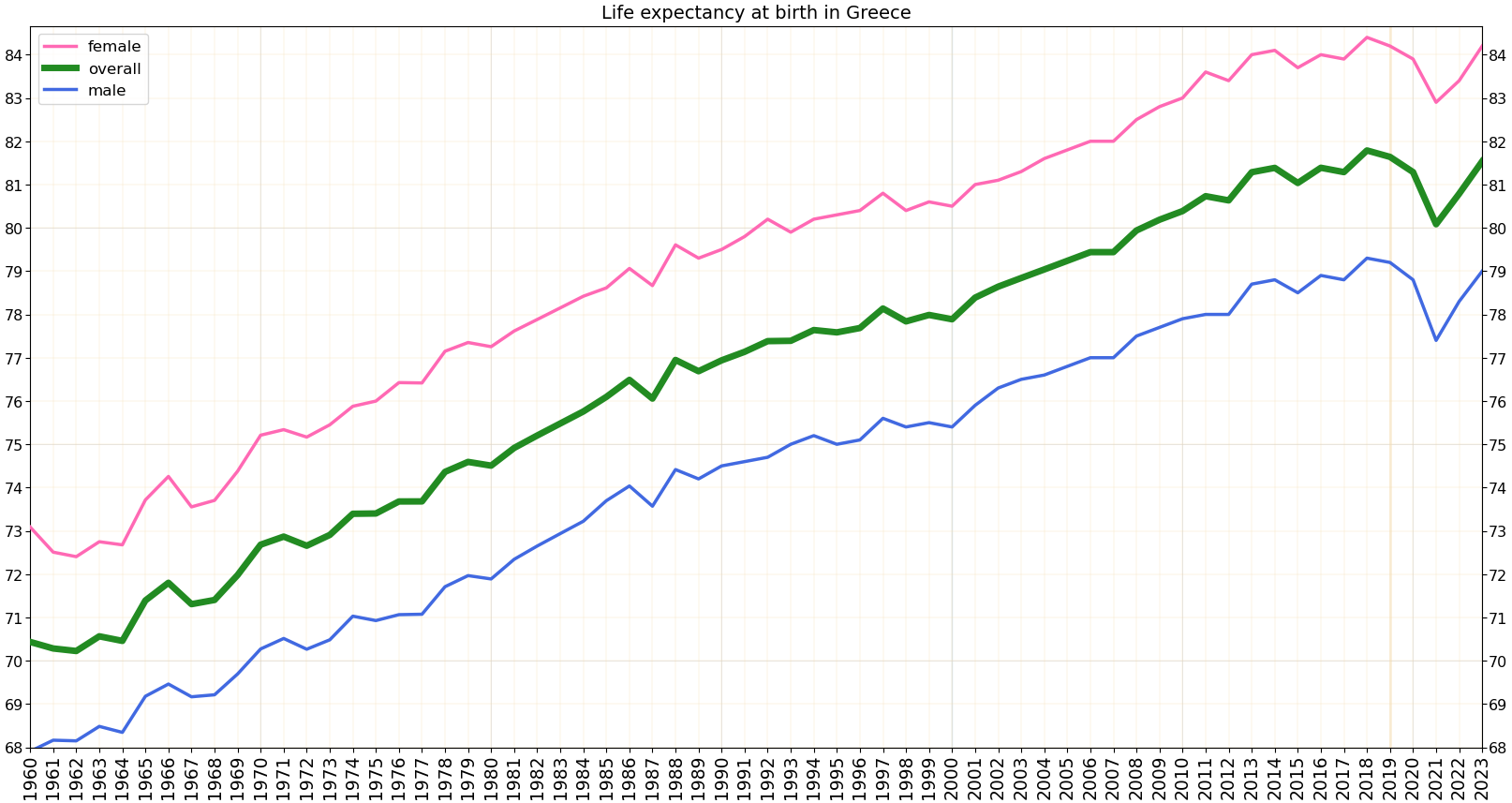
Life expectancy at birth in Greece

Greece had the highest rate of male smokers in Europe in 2015: 53%.

The Human Rights Measurement Initiative finds that Greece is fulfilling 88.6% of what it should be fulfilling for the right to health based on its level of income.

== See also ==
- Healthcare in Greece
- Smoking in Greece
- Obesity in Greece
