= Obesity in Argentina =

Health issue in Argentina

Obesity in Argentina is a growing health concern with health officials stating that it is one of the leading causes of preventable deaths in Argentina. According to FAO/UNO, the prevalence of obesity among adults in Argentina was of 29.4% in 2022.

== Official Statistics ==
Information from the Argentina's Ministry of Health shows the following progression recorded since 2005 when was launched the National Survey for Risk Factors, in Spanish: "Encuesta Nacional de Factores de Riesgo" for Non-communicable diseases (ENFR)

- 2005 = 14.6%
- 2009 = 18%
- 2013 = 20.8%
- 2005-2013 period variation = 42.5%

6 out of 10 registered as overweight and 2 out of 10 as obese.

The data of the survey was gathered by 1,000 surveyors who interviewed 32,365 adults older than 18 years in cities larger than 5,000 inhabitants around the nation. The 70.7% (32.365) of the people that were asked to take survey did accept to be interviewed.

== See also ==
- Health in Argentina
- Epidemiology of obesity
