= Health in Hungary =

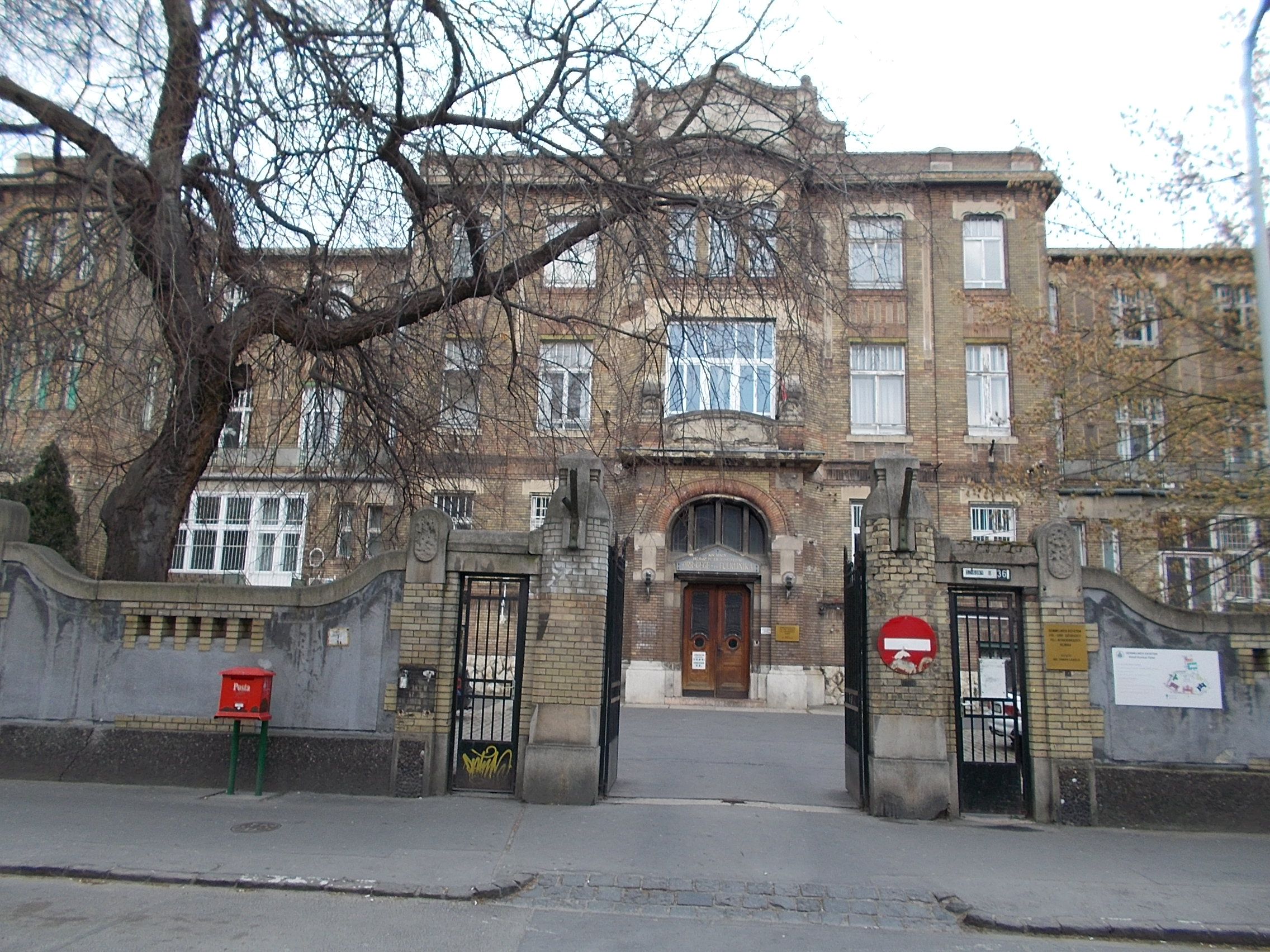
Department of Otorhinolaryngology, Losonci neighbourhood, Budapest

Although death rates have decreased in Hungary since 1985, life expectancy remains low by European standards, particularly among Romani people. Almost half the deaths are caused by cardiovascular disease. A tax on some high-sugar foods, introduced in 2011, has encountered opposition from the confectionery trade. Drinking remains a major health problem, while smoking prevalence has greatly decreased. Health, in general, is poorer in the southern and eastern parts of the country.

== Public health measures ==
In 2016 Hunbisco produced a critical report on the implementation of the sugar tax which was introduced in Hungary in 2011. It reported that the consumption of products subject to the sugar tax had decreased. They argued that manufacturers now have a smaller budget to explore healthier alternatives to sugar. Innovation and new marketing initiatives have reduced since 2011. The effect of the health tax, in addition to 27% VAT, increases the price of products by as much as 40% and has led to redundancies. They say that the consumption of other products not subject to the tax but with similar nutritional contents, like popcorn, has not dropped. They advocate the abolition of the tax in favor of educational measures.

In 2011 the government passed a new tax levied on food products containing excessive amounts of salt, sugar or caffeine and since 2014 it is illegal to advertise food products containing more than 2% trans-fatty acids.

== Mortality statistics ==
=== Life expectancy ===
Despite recent improvements, life expectancy in Hungary is still among the lowest in the European Union. Romani people have a life expectancy up to ten years lower than ethnic Hungarians.

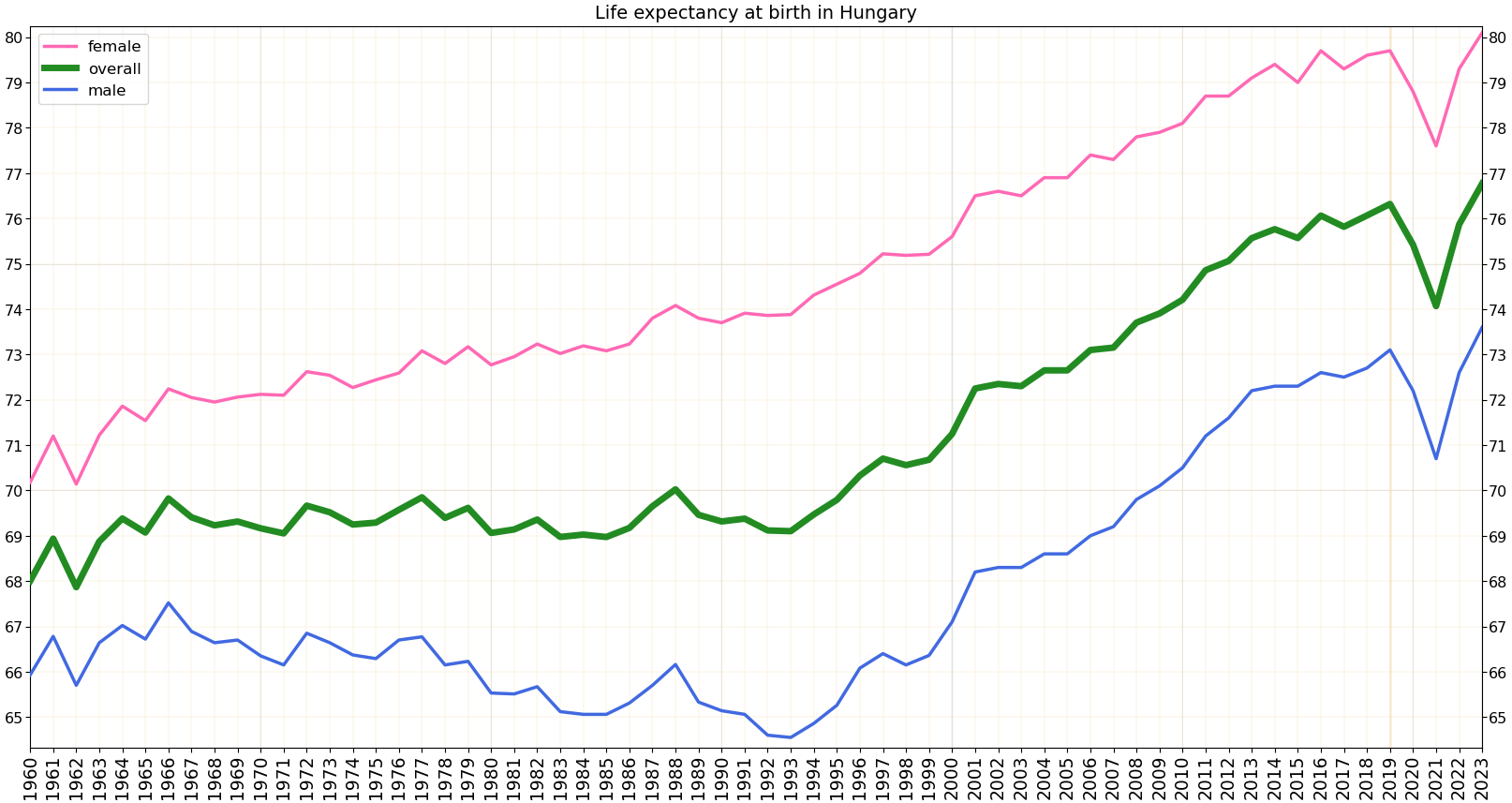
Life expectancy at birth in Hungary

Year	Life expectancy (years, man/woman)	Infant mortality rate (‰)	Suicide rate (per 100,000 people)
1949	59.28 / 63.40	91.0	23.9
1960	65.89 / 70.10	47.6	26.0
1970	66.31 / 72.08	35.9	34.6
1980	65.45 / 72.70	23.2	44.9
1990	65.13 / 73.71	14.8	39.8
2001	68.15 / 76.46	8.1	29.2
2011	70.93 / 78.23	4.9	24.3
2012	71.45 / 78.38	4.9	23.7
2013	72.01 / 78.73	5.1	21.1
2020	72.21 / 78.74	3.5	17.49

=== Major causes of death ===
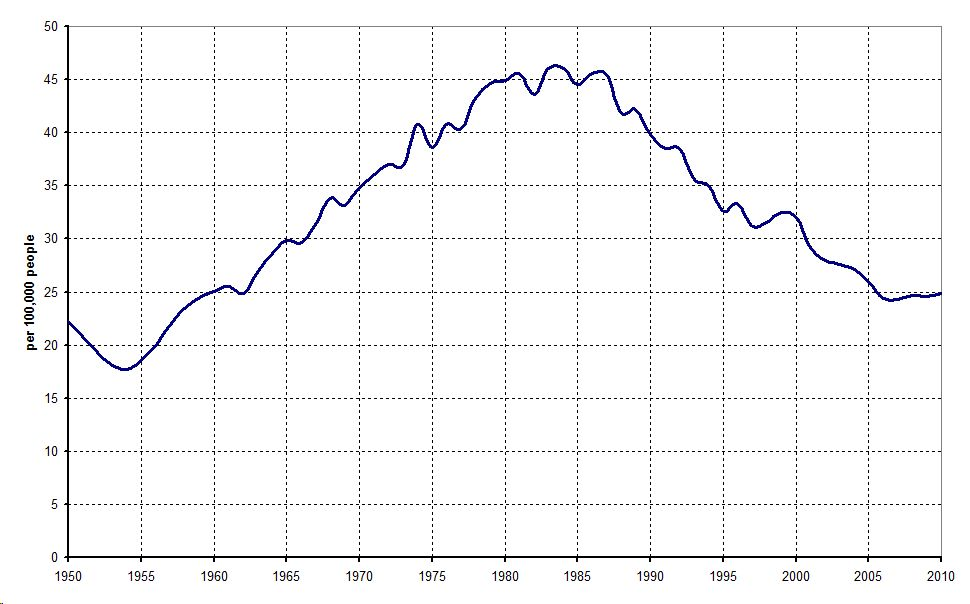
Suicide rate in Hungary (1950–2010). Since the fall of Communism the suicide rate decreased rapidly.

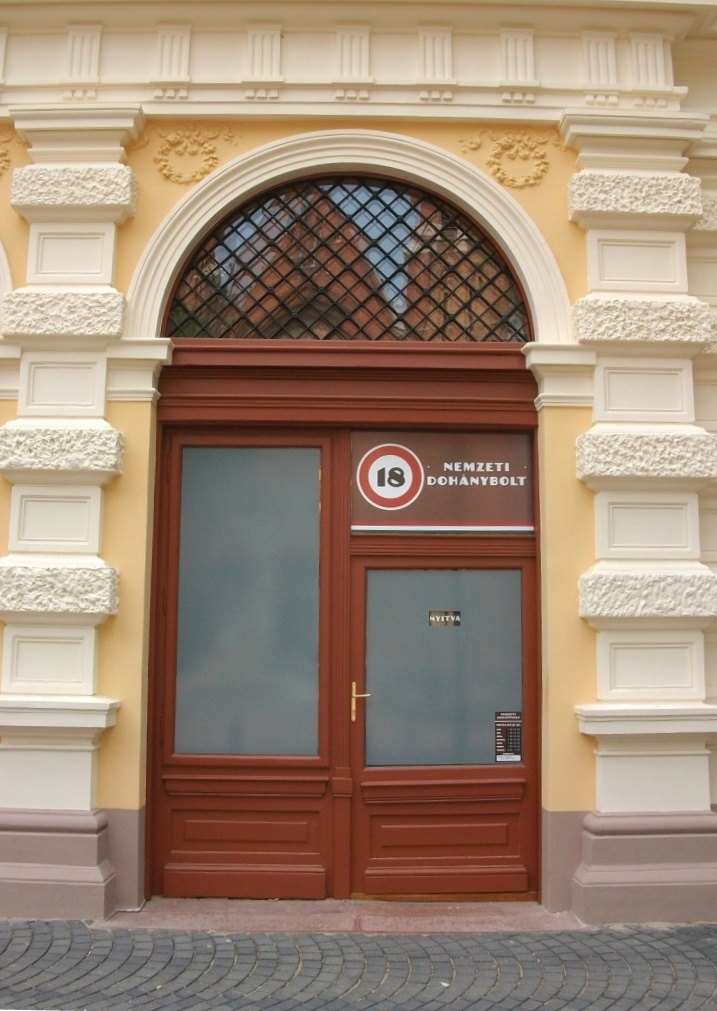
Nemzeti dohánybolt (National Tobacco Shop) in Békéscsaba. These state-controlled shops have the same design and regulation all over Hungary.

62,979 deaths (49.4% of all) in Hungary were caused by cardiovascular disease in 2013. The number of cardiovascular disease deaths peaked in 1985 at 79,355, declining continuously since the fall of Communism. The second most important cause of death was cancer with 33,274 (26.2% of all), stagnating since the 1990s. The number of accident deaths dropped from 8,760 in 1990 to 3,654 in 2013, and the number of suicides from 4,911 in 1983 to 2,093 (21.1 per 100,000 people) in 2013 (the lowest data registered since 1956). According to Péter Polt, Chief Prosecutor of Hungary, there were only 133 homicides in 2012, which is the lowest number registered in the last 50 years in Hungary. The homicide rate was 1.3 per 100,000 people, which is among the lowest in the World.

== Major health issues ==
Despite recent improvements, alcoholism is still a major problem in Hungary, inherited from the Socialist era. According to KSH estimates, the number of alcohol addicts was 1,052,000 (10% of the total population) in 1995, and declined to 432,000 (4.3% of the total population) in 2005. Hungarians drank 9.5 litres of pure alcohol per capita in 2012; in 2005 alcohol consumption took the form of 40% wine, 35% beer, and 24% spirits.). Annual alcohol consumption has remained constant at between 9 and 11.5 liters of pure alcohol since the 1970s.

=== Smoking ===
Smoking also causes significant losses to Hungarian society. 28% of the adult population smoked in 2012, dropping to 25.8% in 2014 due to new regulations. Nationwide smoking bans have been extended to every indoor public place (including pubs), and the sale of tobacco is limited to state-controlled (but privately owned) tobacco shops called Nemzeti dohánybolt (National Tobacco Shop). The number of stores where people can buy tobacco decreased from 40,000–42,000 to 5,300. In 2013 WHO gave an award to Prime Minister Viktor Orbán for "accomplishments in the area of tobacco control".

The Hungarian Central Statistical Office measures smoking habits on a five-year basis. In 2019 24,5% of the adult population used tobacco products daily while 55,2% never smoked. Overall the percentage of adults who regularly smoke dropped from 27% in 2009 to 24,5% in 2019. According to the Hungarian Society of Cardiology approximately 40,000 people die from smoking-related causes such as cancer. A 2017 study found that primary care doctors provide insufficient treatment to those suffering from nicotine addiction and seeking to quit. Only 2% of smokers received pharmacotherapy while 25% of the participants were treated with brief intervention programs. These findings articulated the need for better guidelines for general practitioners to treat nicotine addiction more effectively.

== Regional differences ==
According to the last Országos Lakossági Egészségfelmérés ("National Population Health Survey") held in 2003 the most healthy region is Western Transdanubia and the least is the Southern Great Plain. There are huge differences between the western and eastern parts of Hungary, heart disease, hypertension, stroke and suicide is prevalent in the mostly agricultural and low-income characteristic Great Plain (can be described as the Hungarian Stroke Belt), but infrequent in the high-income and middle class characteristic Western Transdanubia. Central Hungary (region of Budapest) is between east and west by health.

== See also ==
Healthcare in Hungary
