= Josefina C. Bignone Eye Institute =

Visual rehabilitation institute in Buenos Aires, Argentina

Coordinates: 34.5283°S 58.4798°W

The Josefina C. Bignone Rehabilitation Institute for Visually Impaired and Blind People provides rehabilitation services for sight-impaired people in Buenos Aires, Argentina. The institute is funded by the Municipal Direction of Disability (an agency of the Buenos Aires City Legislature) and by the Ministry of Public Health. It was founded in 2001. The institute aims to promote eye health and prevent, detect and treat eye diseases.

== History ==
The house in which the institution resides was a donation from the Bignone family to the federal government that in turn gave the property to the municipality of Vicente Lopez to be used as a rehabilitation center for people with impaired vision. The donation became effective on 23 May 2000, and the institute was founded in 2001.

In 2013, it was suggested that the center should be closed and patients moved to other care centers. The suggestion was opposed by members of the Argentinian socialist party and support groups for the patients. In August 2014, it was decided that the center should continue its operation and the Ministry of Health should allocate funds for it.

== Activities ==
The institute helps patients to re-enter society. The Institute hosts an audio library, workshops in Braille, theatre, conversation, writing, gardening, recreation, tourism, ceramic, fabric and lumen (group of voluntary readers). Individual and group therapy for patients and families is available. Social workers promote the defence of patient rights, encourage patients to actively participate, reduce social risk and facilitate approvals of disabled status. The Institute provides education about how to include vision impaired students in school.

The audio library is open to the community. It includes copies of graphic books (support of the work in ink), of audiobooks (support in cassette), of digital audible books (supports in CD's), and publications in Braille. The library works to convert reading materials into audio format.

== Renovations ==
Major renovations, both interior and exterior, were made on the institute in 2013. These were made to improve the care and safety for the 1,500–1,700 patients treated at the institute each month.

== See also ==
- Physical medicine and rehabilitation
- Health care in Argentina
