= Tobacco in Latin America =

Tobacco in Latin America deals with the cultivation of tobacco, the tobacco industry (especially cigars and cigarettes), smoking behavior, and efforts to control smoking.

== History ==
Tobacco cultivation has a long history in Latin America, dating back to before colonization. The earliest evidence comes from a site in modern El Salvador in 500 AD. Tobacco was cultivated throughout most of Latin America prior to colonization, during the colonial period (1500-1800), and in the postcolonial period (from 1800 onward). Tobacco had been grown by pre-Columbian peoples in the Americas for centuries before 1492. Christopher Columbus in his journal described how indigenous people used tobacco by lighting dried herbs wrapped in a leaf and inhaling the smoke. Tobacco, derived from the Taino word "tabaco," was used in medicine and in religious rituals. The Taino people utilized dried tobacco leaves, which they smoked using pipes and cigars. Alternatively, they finely crushed the leaves and inhaled them through a hollow tube. The natives employed uncomplicated yet efficient tools for planting and caring for their crops. Their primary tool was a planting stick, referred to as a "coa" among the Taino, which measured around five feet in length and featured a sharp point that had been hardened through fire.

The Spaniards quickly realized that tobacco use was widespread among the indigenous communities they encountered throughout the Americas and began to imitate the practice. Before Columbus, tobacco was unknown in Europe. However, after its discovery, tobacco imported from Spanish Latin America became a lucrative and heavily traded commodity, supporting the popular habit of smoking. The arrival of Europeans and the introduction of tobacco played a significant role in colonization and the introduction of African slave labor.

At first small-scale farming of tobacco occurred in Cuba, Honduras, Ecuador, Argentina, and Colombia. Commercial tobacco farming began in the late eighteenth century and became an important component of the economy in countries like Mexico, Colombia, and Cuba. To maintain control over commercial tobacco production, the Spanish Crown designated specific zones for tobacco farming and established tobacco monopolies in larger countries. In 1717, the Spanish Crown established a monopoly over Cuban tobacco production, which made enormous profits from processing and selling the Cuban leaf. From 1740 to 1760, about 85 percent of the tobacco processed by the royal factory in Seville came from Cuba, and this monopoly produced annual profits that grew from nearly 4 million pesos in the early 1740s to over 5 million by the late 1750s, and exceeded the profit from silver. Tobacco played a role in the illegal trade that flourished in remote parts of the Spanish Empire in the eighteenth century, undermining Spanish colonialism. In 1740, a contract was granted by the Spanish Crown to a consortium of merchants who formed the Havana Company. The company tried to reduce the output of tobacco leaves in order to eliminate illicit sales. It acquired an exclusive right to buy and export three million pounds of premium Cuban tobacco to Spain. The tobacco was then processed at the royal factory in Seville. In the Portuguese colony of Brazil, tobacco was primarily cultivated in Bahia. It was legally exported to Portugal, while also being illicitly sent to Buenos Aires and Upper Peru. Brazilian tobacco was exchanged for slaves in West Africa.

According to Burkholder and Johnson:

The creation of state-run tobacco monopolies also had dramatic and unforeseen consequences in the peripheral colonies....The monopolies limited legal tobacco production, set prices, processed and manufactured tobacco products, and controlled retail sales. Even though consumer demand in the colonies and in Europe pushed upward, tobacco growers gained only limited benefits. Consumers also found these poor person's luxuries increasingly expensive. The Crown, however, earned heady profits. Because the monopoly paid cash, the tobacco-producing regions of Venezuela, New Granada, and especially Paraguay were able to develop new commercial relations with regional and even international markets. As cash replaced barter, the largest urban centers established more effective domination over the countryside.

=== After 1800 ===
After Latin American independence in the nineteenth century, traders in London, Amsterdam, and the independent Hanseatic towns in northern Germany, became important importers of Latin American tobacco. The markets for cigars and cigarettes in Europe contributed to the rapid expansion of the tobacco trade in the nineteenth and twentieth centuries. European traders supported Latin American independence and benefited greatly when the new Latin American republics opened their commercial borders.

== Argentina ==
In the 20th century, the government promoted settlement and economic development in the northern subtropical zones, with tobacco playing a central role. A new government agency worked to educate farmers and promote the cultivation, processing, and marketing of tobacco. While tobacco factories were initially concentrated around Buenos Aires, they gradually extended into the northern production regions. By 1960, Argentina accomplished self-sufficiency in tobacco production. By the 1970s, its annual output exceeded 60,000 metric tons, with one-third exported. Argentina held the global rank of third place in terms of production, trailing behind Brazil and Mexico.

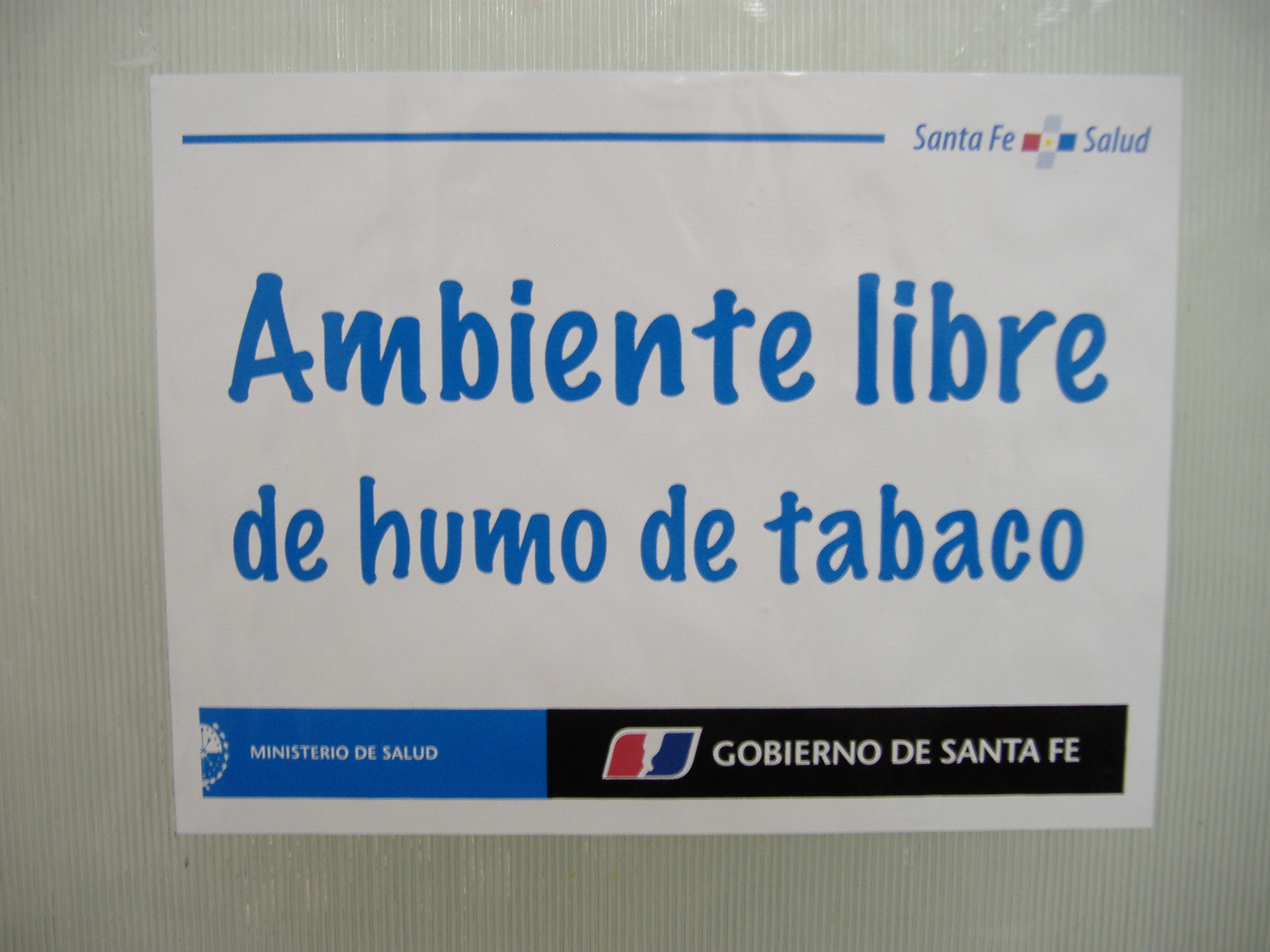
A sign in an Argentine government office in Rosario, Santa Fe: Tobacco smoke-free environment, reflecting provincial Ministry of Health regulations.

Smoking in Argentina accounts for 15% of total tobacco consumption in the Americas. There are a number of smoking restrictions in place in different jurisdictions, and a nationwide governmental campaign against tobacco smoking and advertising. Since June 1, 2011 a smoking ban in all of Argentina prohibits smoking in workplaces, all public indoor areas, schools, hospitals, museums and libraries, theatres, and all public transport.

In 2006, the prevalence of current tobacco use was 32% (35% among men, 29% among women). Approximately 90% of the population who smoked did so on a daily basis, and 30% smoked an average of 20 cigarettes per day. Tobacco causes 40,000 deaths per year, 6,000 due to secondhand smoke. The cost of the treatment of tobacco-related diseases amounts to 6020 million Argentine pesos ($1324 million USD) per year, 15.5% of the total public expenditure on health care. The government collects 3500 million pesos per year in taxes on cigarettes.

== See also ==
- Smoking in Argentina
- Smoking in Brazil
- Smoking in Colombia
- Smoking in Costa Rica
- Smoking in Cuba
  - Cuban cigars
- Smoking in Ecuador
