= Tobacco industry in Argentina =

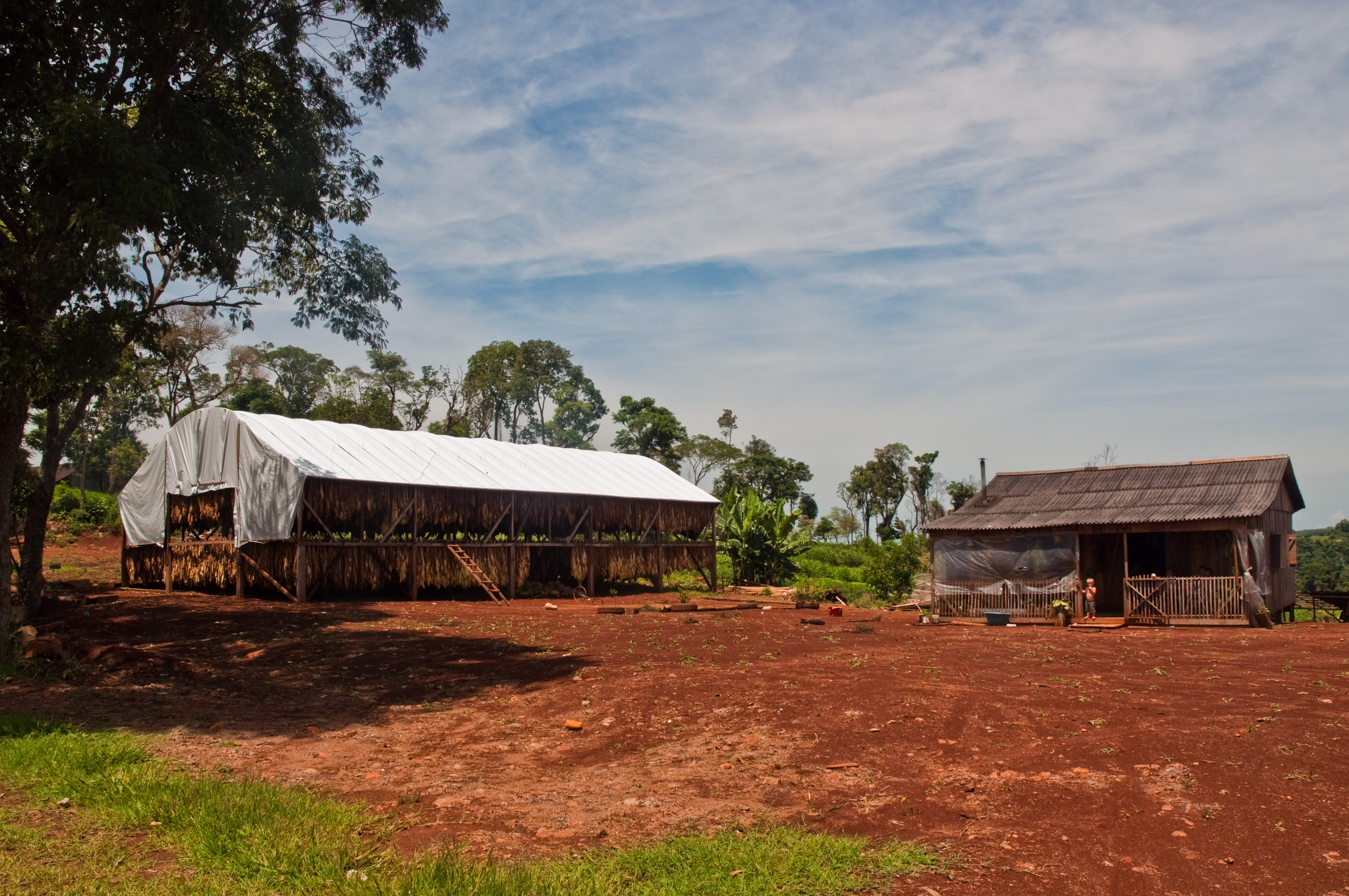
Tobacco drying in Misiones Province, Argentina, 2011.

The tobacco industry of Argentina produced 157,294 tonnes of tobacco in the 2003–2004 harvest, most of which (93,327 tonnes) was exported. The planted area was 831.75 km^{2}, of which 776 were harvested.

The tobacco industry is dominated by two transnational companies: Massalin Particulares S.A. (a subsidiary of Philip Morris International, which sells the Marlboro brand, and which in turn is associated with Tabacos Norte S.A.) and Nobleza Piccardo (a subsidiary of British American Tobacco, which sells international brands such as Lucky Strike, Viceroy and Camel, as well as national ones like Jockey and Derby).

Tobacco producers are concentrated in the north of the country. The provinces of Jujuy and Salta (in the north-west), and Misiones (in the north-eastern Mesopotamia), are the largest, producing over 45,000 tonnes/year each. The other tobacco-producing provinces are Tucumán, Corrientes, Chaco and Catamarca.

Tobacco plays an important role in the economy of the producing areas, which are comparatively poor provinces. The Argentine tobacco industry employs 500,000 people, about half of them directly involved in the planting and harvesting, only about 2% in the manufacturing of the derived products, and the rest in distribution and sales. Therefore, despite the fact that the consequences of smoking are a major health issue in Argentina, the national government supports the producers by means of a Tobacco Special Fund (Fondo Especial del Tabaco, FET), which consists of a subsidy plus easier access to credit in order to modernize the industry.

== Labor practices ==
An important number of Argentina's tobacco industry employees are mostly underage workers. The TVPRA List of Goods Produced by Child Labor or Forced Labor published in December 2014 by the Bureau of International Labor Affairs underlines the existence of such practices in Argentina. The United States Department of Labor reported that despite the implementation of educational programs, "children in Argentina continue to engage in child labor in agriculture and the worst forms of child labor..."

== See also ==
- Smoking in Argentina
- Agriculture in Argentina
