= Obesity in Greece =

Share of adults that are obese, 1975 to 2016

Obesity in Greece is a growing health concern with health officials stating that it is one of the leading causes of preventable deaths in Greece.

== Extent ==
According to Forbes, Greece ranks 16 on a 2007 list of fattiest countries with a percentage of 65.5% of its citizens with an unhealthy weight. This may be a surprise to most individuals because in the past Mediterranean countries like Greece were known to live a pretty healthy lifestyle. The Mediterranean diet was developed based on the food patterns in these different countries, Greece being a main one. In the past the people of Greece consumed a diet consisting mainly of fish, fruit, vegetable, and wine, limiting meats. These countries also were fairly active which helps to keep them healthy.

Today's European countries are moving away from this Mediterranean lifestyle and towards a more Western way of life. Indulging on the fast foods and limited daily activity are to blame on for this increase in obesity in Greece. An article from the Associated Press states that obesity rates in some European countries are higher than that of the United States.

Greece's growing health concerns related to obesity are becoming an issue that was not evident in the past because of an increase in consumption of high fat, high calorie, fast foods and decreased levels of activity. Obesity brings on health concerns such as diabetes and cardiovascular disease. Greece is adopting a western style of eating and straying away from the active lifestyles they once possessed.

== See also ==
- Health in Greece
- Epidemiology of obesity
