= Smoking in Mexico =

Smoking in Mexico occurs at a rate of roughly 13% of the population, and Mexico is ranked 130 in the world in annual cigarette consumption — a lower per capita cigarette consumption than Argentina, Brazil, or the US.

== See also ==
- Cannabis in Mexico
- List of smoking bans
- Prevalence of tobacco use
