= Smoking in Timor-Leste =

Smoking in Timor-Leste is very common, with the country having one of the highest percentages of smokers in the world: according to a 2014 BBC article, 33% smoked every day, 61% for men. The situation is getting worse; 31.5% of adults smoked in 2020, but in 2024 that figure rose to 42%. There is an enormous gender disparity; among adult males, 39.5% smoked in 2017, 65.8% in 2019, 57.7% in 2020 and 74.6% in 2024, while the corresponding figures for women were 5.1% in 2017, 10.7% in 2019, 4.9% in 2020 and 9.1% in 2024.

A study in 2008 found that stress brought on from poverty and the struggle for independence significantly contributed towards youth smoking. Former president and independence activist Xanana Gusmão is himself a heavy smoker who said that cigarettes helped him and his colleagues stay calm while they were fighting the Indonesians.

Although it is required that packaging display warnings, about half of East Timorese adults cannot read. There is very little restriction on tobacco advertisement and it is common to see teachers and students smoking in school. According to a 2020 journal article, a survey determined that 29.7% of students have reported smoking or using tobacco at least once within the previous 30 days.

In November 2015 the East Timorese government promised tighter rules governing tobacco consumption. In 2023, a pack of 20 cigarettes can cost $3.50, compared to $1 two decades before, due to a high excise tax on tobacco. The tax was raised 163% in January 2022 and another 100% in January 2023, to $100 per kg.
