= Hunbisco =

Confectionery trade association of Hungary

Hunbisco is the Hungarian confectionery association.

It is one of the 17 members of CAOBISCO, the Association of Chocolate, Biscuit and Confectionery Industries of Europe.

In 2016 it produced a critical report on the implementation of the sugar tax which was introduced in Hungary in 2011. It reported that the consumption of products subject to the sugar tax had decreased. They argued that manufacturers now have a smaller budget to explore healthier alternatives to sugar. Innovation and new marketing initiatives have reduced since 2011. The effect of the health tax, in addition to 27% VAT, increases the price of products by as much as 40% and has led to redundancies. They say that the consumption of other products not subject to the tax but with similar nutritional contents, like popcorn, has not dropped. They advocate abolition of the tax in favour of educational measures.
