= Smoking in Albania =

Albanian act Reform

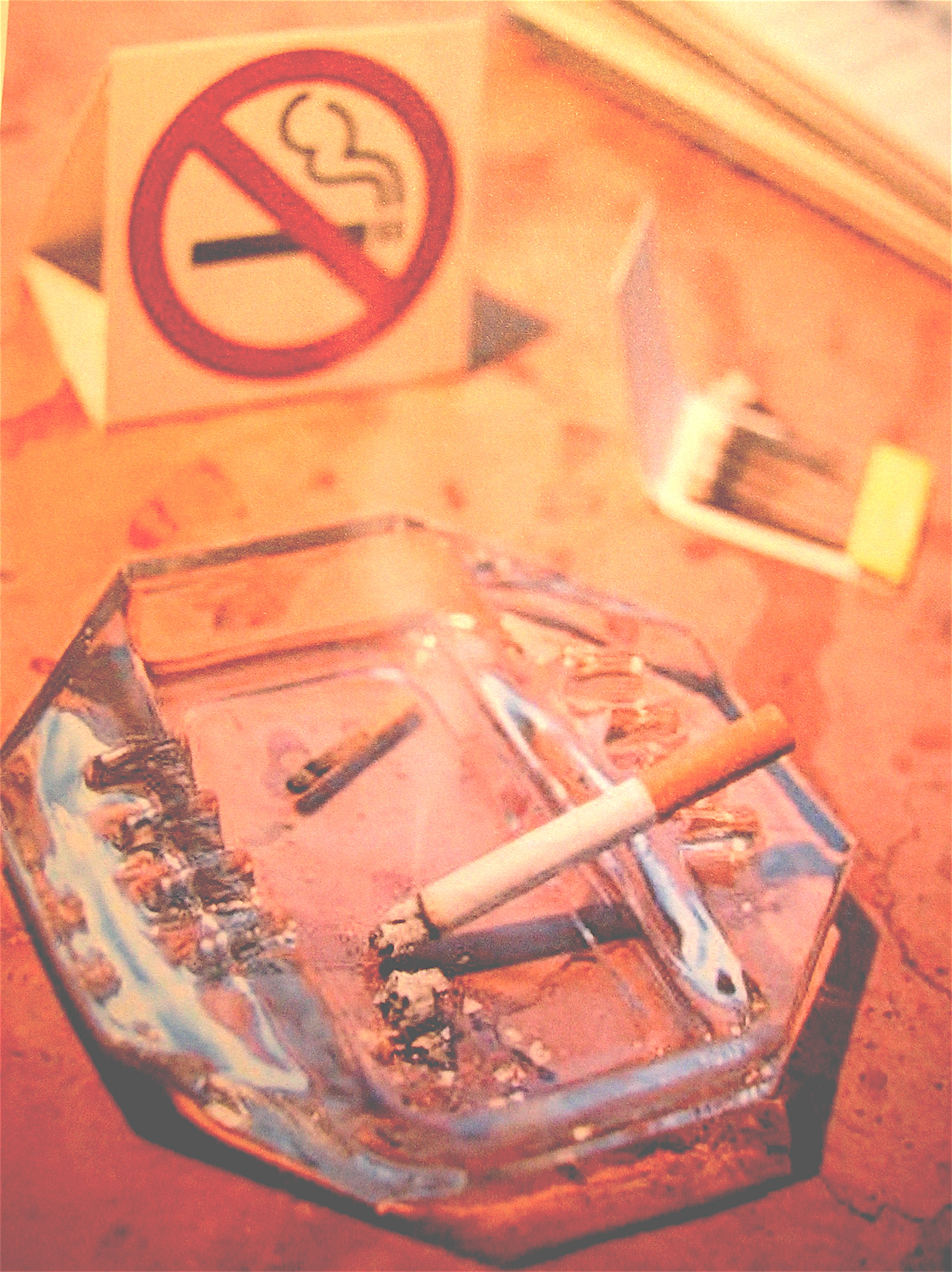
The international no smoking sign is posted in all bars and restaurants but is almost always ignored in Albania.

Smoking in Albania is prevalent, as about 40% of Albanians smoke regularly. In Europe, only Turkey has a higher smoking rate than Albania. Albanians annually spend more than €300 million on tobacco products. Albania adopted tough anti-smoking laws in 2007, but they are not strictly enforced. Smoking prevalence is increasing, especially among girls ages 13 to 15. The smoking rate for teens between the ages of 13 and 15 is currently 15%.

Although the law technically forbids the smoking of cigarettes in public spaces like restaurants, bars, and work places Albanians regularly smoke in those places, especially nights and weekends. The smoking ban is generally followed on public transport in Tirana, as people put out cigarettes before boarding buses.

Zog I of Albania was reported to smoke 200 cigarettes a day.
