= Smoking in Sri Lanka =

Smoking in Sri Lanka is regulated by the WHO Framework Convention on Tobacco Control, which the country joined on February 27, 2005, the National Authority on Tobacco and Alcohol Act No. 27 of 2006 (NATA). Smoking is prohibited in government faculties, public transportation, taxis, prisons, private offices, hospitals, various healthcare facilities, childcare facilities and schools, indoor stadiums and arenas, cultural facilities, and shops. Smoking is restricted in restaurants, bars, nightclubs, hotels, public transport facilities, indoor workplaces and indoor public places.

Tobacco and cigarette sales are also controlled by NATA and a 2015 amendment. 80% of tobacco product packaging must be covered in warnings and advertisement via "mass media" is prohibited. Tobacco products must not be sweetened or artificially flavoured, nor sold to individuals under the age of 21, or in vending machines inside educational facilities. E-cigarettes may not be sold in the country.
