= Smoking in Vietnam =

Smoking in Vietnam is a major health concern, with an estimated 50% of men and 5% of women using tobacco, an estimated 18 million smokers in 2013. In the same year, 47 million non-smokers in Vietnam were regularly exposed to tobacco smoke. Vietnam's Health Education and Communication Center estimates that 40,000 people will die annually in Vietnam from first- or secondhand smoking, and that if nothing changes, 10% of the Vietnamese population would die from smoking-related illnesses by 2030. Secondhand smoking is noted to have worsened over the years, with more measures required for smoke-free environments favorable for non-smokers.

== Thuốc lào ==
A traditional form of tobacco smoking in Vietnam is called thuốc lào, where the highly potent leaves of the Nicotiana rustica plant are smoked through a water pipe, which is called điếu cày.

Smoking thuốc lào is considered far more dangerous than cigarette smoking. Apart from the regular harms caused by smoke inhalation, there have been several instances of individuals choking to death or suffering sudden respiratory failure due to the sudden inhalation of large amounts of smoke.
