= Smoking in Hungary =

Smoking in Hungary is an important public health issue. Several studies have shown that smoking of tobacco or narcotics (e.g. cannabis) have different negative impacts on society. (Vide Health effects of tobacco, Effects of cannabis) That is why this topic has come into discussion in different political, economical, scientific and medical forums.

== Statistics ==
According to the World Health Organization, 28.2% of the population aged 15 or above smoked regularly.

== Laws ==
Hungary's laws forbid people from smoking within 5 meters of the entrances to primary schools, secondary schools, universities, dormitories and other higher education institutions. Furthermore, it is not allowed to smoke in public transport, pubs, bars, restaurants and in national institutions.

It is also forbidden for children under the age of 18 to buy cigarettes.

The sale of tobacco is limited to state-controlled (but privately owned) tobacco shops called Nemzeti Dohánybolt (National Tobacco Shop).

== Politics ==
In 2013 the World Health Organization gave an award to Prime Minister Viktor Orbán for "accomplishments in the area of tobacco control".

== Tobacco factories ==
Several types of cigarettes can be found in Hungary. Three large tobacco companies have producing facilities in the country.

| Name | Owner | Founded | Famous products | Location | Website |
|---|---|---|---|---|---|
| Róna Dohányfeldolgozó Kft. | Landewyck Tobacco (1993–) | 1867 | | Debrecen, Hajdú-Bihar | |
| Pécsi Dohánygyár (Tobacco Factory Pécs) | British American Tobacco (1992–) | 1912 | Pall Mall; Kent; Dunhill; Lucky Strike; Vogue; Sopianae; Peter Stuyvesant; Viceroy | Pécs, Baranya | |
| Continental Dohányipari Zrt. | Continental Dohányipari Csoport (1998–) | 1891 | | Sátoraljaújhely, Borsod-Abaúj-Zemplén | |

There are also many import products on the market.

== See also ==
- European Tobacco Products Directive
- Prevalence of tobacco consumption
- Smoking
