= Smoking in Latvia =

Smoking in Latvia is common, with a rate higher than the OECD average, and Latvian men are among the heaviest smokers in the European Union. One in four Latvians smoke, as compared to one in five in the rest of the European Union. While the overall smoking rate in Latvia has decreased in recent years, it is considered a significant factor in the country's significant health challenges, particularly with regard to preventable diseases such as heart disease, diabetes, and cancer.

== Smoking rates by demographic ==
22.6% of Latvians smoke regularly. It's a decrease from a rate of one in three in 2000, but the national rate is still considerably higher than the international average.

=== Men and women ===
Smoking is particularly common among adult men; more than half smoke regularly, one of the highest rates in the OECD. The rate tracks the OECD average at about one in five. However, smoking rates overall have decreased considerably in recent years, due in part to a range of policies aimed at reducing the smoking rate in recent years, including taxation, tobacco labelling, public health campaigns, a ban on tobacco advertising, and a ban on smoking in most public places.

=== Young people ===
Latvia has a higher prevalence of smoking tobacco in children than many other European countries. The Global Youth Tobacco Survey (GYTS) in 2011 found that 40.5% of children in grades 7 through 9 reported current tobacco use, while 31.5% were smoking cigarettes. However, the percentage of children smoking tobacco decreased. A World Health Organization Global Youth Tobacco Survey found that, between 2011-2014 among boys aged 13 to 15, the use of tobacco products fell from 39.4% to 25.3%. Among girls of the same ages, use went down from 41.4% 23.9%.

== Smoking regulations ==
Currently, Latvia upholds the smoking standards set by the World Health Organization by following the FCTC MPOWER tobacco control methods. These measures include monitoring tobacco usage, protecting the public from passive smoking, offering the means to quit smoking, warning the public of the associated dangers, enforcing bans and regulations, and raising tobacco taxation. Multiple laws have been implemented in the last 20 years with these measures in mind that aim to address the dangers of smoking tobacco on an individual's health along with the health of those around them. Many of these regulations resulted from the 56th World Health Assembly, in 2003, after which Latvia adopted the WHO Framework Convention on Tobacco Control (WHO FCTC). In 1995, the advertisement of tobacco products on radio and on television was prohibited. Four years later, the advertisement of tobacco products was only allowed in certain publications that were intended for tobacco merchants and producers, and packaging of tobacco products was required to adhere to certain images and to contain at least two warnings against the dangers of smoking tobacco. By 2005, it was entirely prohibited to smoke in schools and smoking in hospitals, restaurants, correctional facilities, workplaces, casinos, hotels, and other public spaces was prohibited unless within a designated smoking area. As of 2010, it is illegal to sell any smokeless tobacco products and to manufacture or sell cigarettes that exceed 1 mg of nicotine, and health warnings are required to cover approximately half of the surface area of all cigarette packs. In 2013, Latvia passed a by-law on the State Commission on Restriction of Smoking. This state institution was given the task of ensuring the citizens' rights to smoke-free air, by coordinating and submitting proposals on smoking prevention programs and tobacco product requirements.

== See also ==
- European Tobacco Products Directive
- Smoking in Russia
