= Smoking in Ethiopia =

Smoking in Ethiopia has been regulated by a 2019 law banning smoking in all indoor workplaces and on public transport. Tobacco packaging must contain clearly visible health warnings in Ethiopia. Ethiopia's parliament unanimously approved the 2019 legislation, which is one of the strongest anti-tobacco laws in the Africa continent. The law bans the manufacture and sale of any e-cigarette. Ethiopia had joined the WHO Framework Convention on Tobacco Control on June 23, 2014.

== See also ==
- List of smoking bans
- Tobacco in Ethiopia
- Tobacco advertising
