= Smoking in Tokelau =

Smoking in Tokelau is prevalent, with ethnic Tokelauans having the highest smoking prevalence of all Pacific ethnicities. In the 2011 Tokelau Census, 47.8% of people aged over 15 were found to be regular cigarette smokers.

== Legislation ==
New Zealand has provided support to Tokelau in the form of drafting tobacco control legislation. Furthermore, conversations carried out by Ashton Kelly of the University of Otago in late 2014/early 2015 indicate that there is great public support for increased tobacco control. "Tokelau Health" aims to draw inspiration from New Zealand's "smokefree" campaigns and legislation.

Tobacco regulation is expected to be, compared to other nations, easier to carry out. As of 2014, in Tokelau there are only three stores that sell tobacco, and there is no known production of tobacco on the island. Furthermore, with the only way to import goods into Tokelau being a single boat service from Apia, it would be feasible to prevent smuggling.

== Smoking by atoll ==
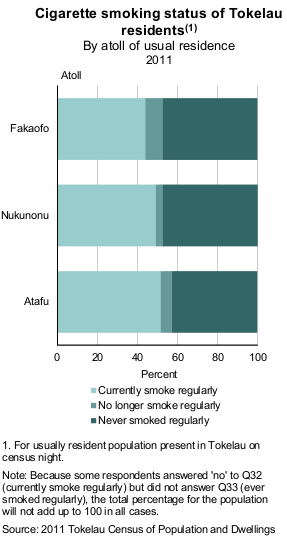
Smoking by atoll, 2011

Atafu has the highest proportion of people who smoke cigarettes regularly, with 51.5% of usual residents present in Tokelau on census night in 2011 being regular smokers.

Fakaofo has the lowest proportion of regular smokers (43.9%) and, compared to Atafu and Nukunonu, Fakaofo has the highest percentage of ex-smokers, with 8.6% of the population having given up smoking cigarettes regularly.

== Smoking by age ==
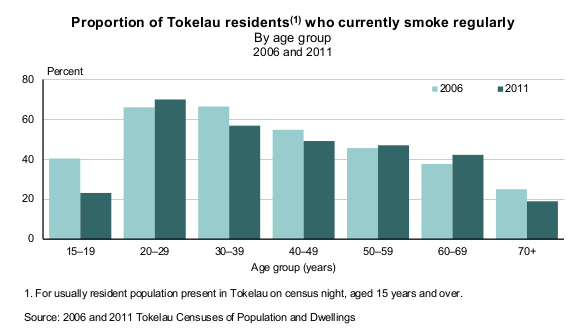
Smoking by age, 2006-2011

At the time of the 2011 Tokelau Census 23.1% of Tokelau's 15- to 19-year-olds smoked cigarettes regularly. This figure has dropped markedly since 2006, when 40.4% of 15- to 19-year-olds smoked regularly.

Also at the time of the 2011 Tokelau Census, nearly 70% of Tokelau's people aged 20 to 29 years smoked cigarettes regularly (69.9%). This is much higher than the national rate (47.8%).

The next-highest proportion of regular smokers was for the 30- to 39-year-olds (56.8%). The older age groups were the least likely to be regular smokers, with 19.0% of those aged over 70 being smokers in 2011.

== Smoking cessation ==
In 2009, 56 Tokelauans called Quitline, a telephone service which helps smokers end their addiction to cigarettes. The same number of Tokelauans called Quitline in 2008.

== See also ==
- Health care in Tokelau
