= Smoking in Egypt =

The use of tobacco products in Egypt is widespread. It is estimated that approximately twenty percent of the population uses tobacco products daily. Cigarettes are the most common form of tobacco consumption in Egypt, with an estimated one hundred billion cigarettes smoked annually in the country. After cigarettes, shisha water-pipes are the most common form of tobacco consumption.

In 2005 legislation was passed in Egypt that prohibits smoking in public places and requires special warnings to be placed on tobacco packaging. Smoking is far more common among men than it is among women, however, the number of women smokers is on the rise. The tobacco industry in Egypt is dominated by the Eastern Tobacco Company; however, since the cultivation of tobacco is prohibited in Egypt the manufacturer must rely entirely on imported tobacco. The number of adults smoking tobacco products in Egypt continues to rise, some suggest by as much as four to five percent annually.

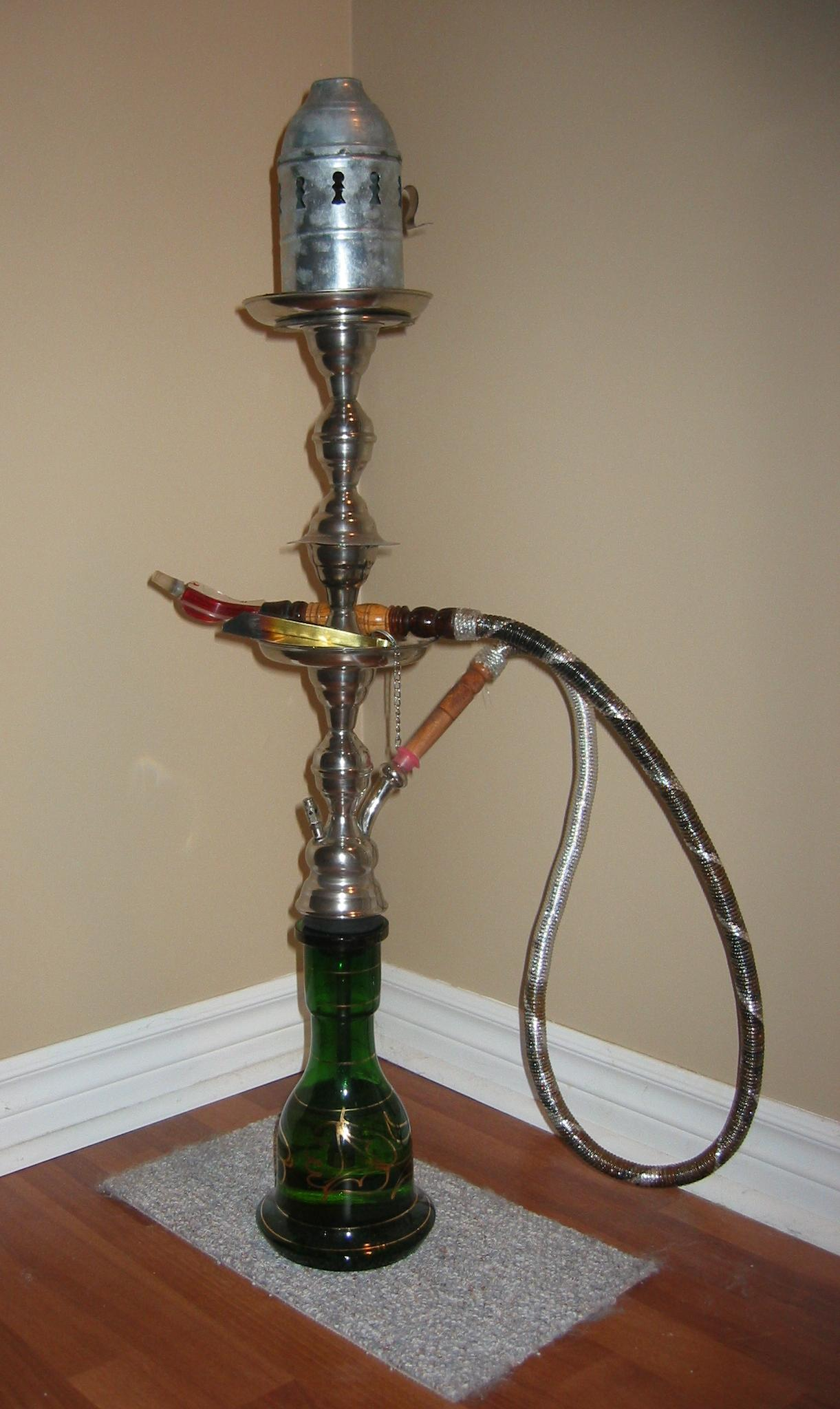
An Egyptian hookah (shisha) with a wind cover over the bowl and a Syrian hose

== Prevalence in society ==
Smoking in Egypt is prevalent with 100 billion cigarettes smoked annually in the country, making it the largest market in the Arab world. Inside cafes, hookah (shisha) smoking is common. As of 2012 smoking in Egypt has reached an all-time high with an estimated twenty percent, twenty million people, regularly using tobacco products.

Egypt is ranked as one of the top ten per capita consumers of tobacco by the World Lung Foundation. Of this twenty percent of the population estimated to use tobacco products, ninety-five percent were daily smokers. Sixteen percent smoke only cigarettes, 3.3% smoke shisha water-pipes, and 2.6% use smokeless tobacco products. While consumption of tobacco in adults is in decline or stagnant in many countries, in Egypt, the number of adult cigarette smokers is increasing at a rate of four to five percent per year

== Smoking in Egyptian history ==
According to historian Relli Shechter, in the late 19th century, the cigarette emerged as a fashionable way to consume tobacco and gained popularity not only in Egypt but also globally and within the Ottoman Empire. Under British control 1882–1922, cigarettes became the preferred smoking choice in Egypt, with luxury Egyptian brands being exported worldwide, influencing global trends. It was notable for being one of the earliest non-Western producers of internationally traded manufactured goods. This industrial growth was surprising as Egypt primarily focused on exporting raw materials and importing finished goods until then. Despite facing challenges such as poor-quality Egyptian-grown tobacco and a tobacco cultivation ban in 1890, the Egyptian cigarette industry thrived and became renowned in the region.

== Islam and smoking ==
Although Islam has no specific ban on smoking tobacco, several Islamic principles are cited in support of the religion-based banning of tobacco. Depending on the location and community, Islamic authorities have either deemed smoking as makruh (to be avoided) or haram (forbidden). On September 5, 1999, Nasr Farid Wasel, the then Grand Mufti of Egypt, issued a fatwa (a religious ruling) against tobacco smoking.

== Smoking in public ==
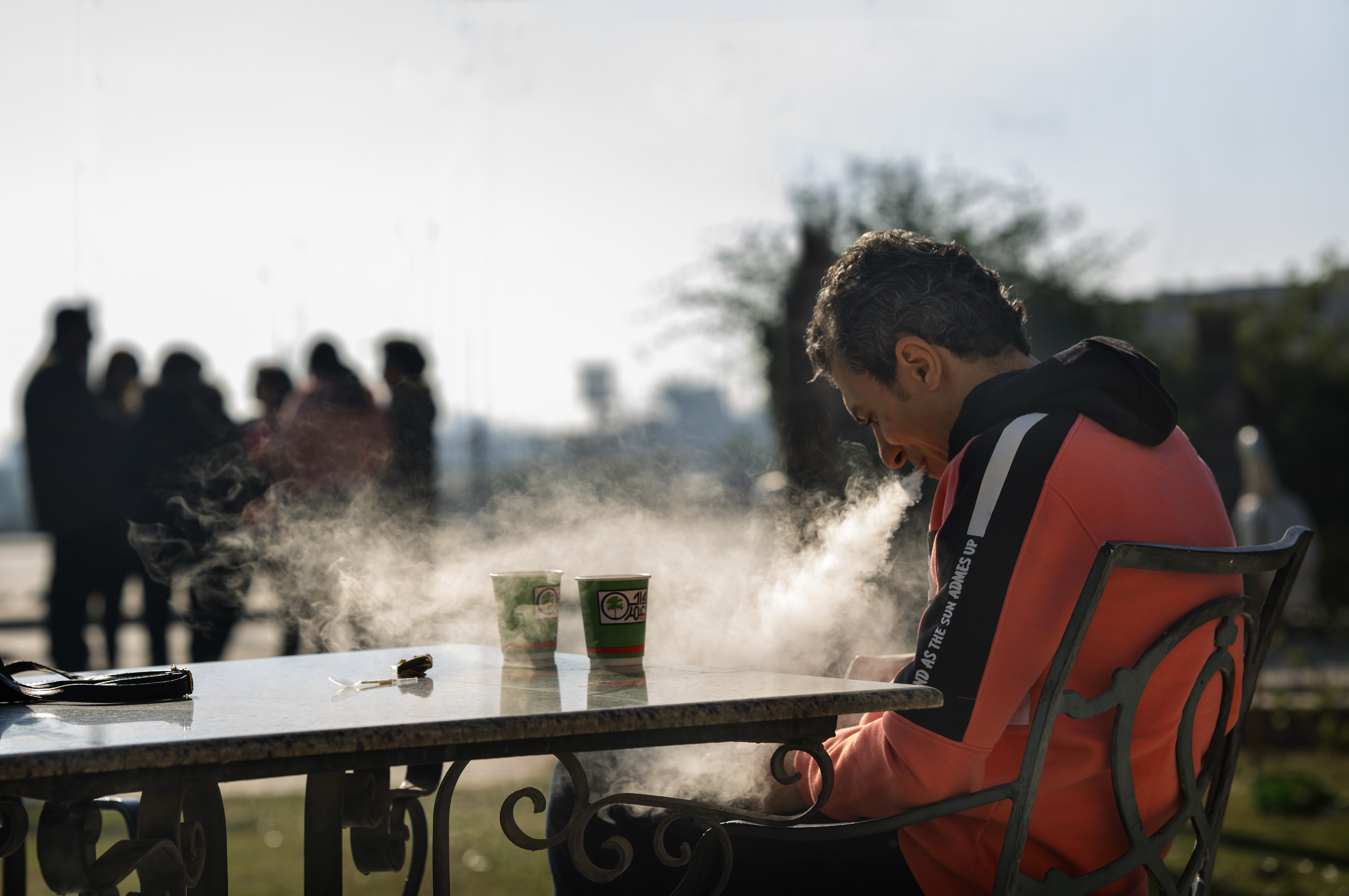
A smoker

In Egypt, the tobacco control law prohibits smoking in the following specified public places: health and educational facilities, governmental venues, sporting and social clubs, and youth centers (though these rules are not usually followed ). Smoking is also prohibited on public transport. Under a separate environmental statute, smoking is restricted to specially designated areas in industrial establishments, tourism related establishments, and electricity production establishments.

== Perception of smoking ==
In a survey conducted of Egyptian smokers, overall 97.6% believed that smoking tobacco can cause serious illness. However, belief that smoking causes specific illness varied. A significant number of smokers believe that shisha is less harmful than other forms of smoking. Approximately 97.4% believed that smoking shisha causes serious illness such as stroke, heart attack, and lung cancer.

A national survey conducted by the Egyptian Smoking Prevention Research Institute showed that waterpipe smoking was inversely related to educational level, and that most users believed that using a waterpipe is less harmful than cigarettes. The survey also showed that more than 70% of male waterpipe smokers smoked in their homes in the presence of their children and wives, calling attention to the unfortunate lack of knowledge regarding indoor environmental tobacco smoke exposure.

== Tobacco industry in Egypt ==
Tobacco cultivation is not legal in Egypt, therefore companies who produce tobacco products must rely on imported raw tobacco largely imported from India and China, as well as from Brazil, Italy, Syrian Arab Republic, and the United States of America. Egypt's tobacco industry is dominated by the Eastern Tobacco Company (ETC), the largest cigarette manufacturer in the Middle East. A small but ever increasing amount of Egyptian cigarettes are exported to neighboring countries, mostly to serve Egyptians working abroad.

=== Tobacco advertising, promotion, and sponsorship ===
In Egypt, most forms of tobacco advertising and promotion are banned. The law does not specifically ban tobacco sponsorship, nor does it use the term tobacco sponsorship. However, some forms of tobacco sponsorship may be prohibited under the ban on advertising and promotion. Because the terms “tobacco advertising and promotion” and “tobacco sponsorship” are not defined, it is difficult to determine the exact scope of the ban.

=== Tobacco packaging and labeling ===
Starting August 1, 2008 cigarette labels in Egypt began requiring images of the effects of smoking: a dying man in an oxygen mask, a coughing child and a limp cigarette symbolizing impotence. The law requires two textual warnings that must be accompanied by a picture (of a heart, lung, or pregnancy) with additional relevant text. The picture and text should be rotated every six months. The warnings must occupy 50 percent of the front and back principal display areas.

The law prohibits the use of the terms “light,” “low tar,” and “very low tar” on tobacco product packaging. However, the law does not prohibit the use of other misleading terms, descriptors, figures or other indicia that create an erroneous impression about the health effects of a tobacco product including a requirement that the quantity (figurative yield) of tar and nicotine be displayed on tobacco product packages. The law does not require a qualitative statement on constituents and emissions.

=== Tobacco Control Legislation ===
Law No. 52 of 1981 Concerning the Prevention of the Adverse Effects of Tobacco provides the foundation upon which subsequent tobacco legislation rests. This principal law addresses, although briefly, smoke-free policies; advertising, promotion and sponsorship; packaging and labeling; and penalties. Law No. 85 of 2002, Law No. 154 of 2007, Decree No. 443 of 2008, and Executive Bylaw of Law No. 52 of 1981 all amend and/or build upon the comprehensive tobacco control legislation contained in Law No. 52 of 1981. Several other laws and decrees supplement Law No. 52 of 1981 and its amending and subsequent legislation. These laws include: Law No. 137 of 1981, a labor law which established the penalties for smoking while at work or at places of work; and Law No. 4 of 1994, an environmental law addressing smoke-free policies. In addition, Decree No. 465 of 2007, issued by the Ministry of Health and Population, established the Tobacco Control Administration as an administrative body within the Ministry.

== Trends among different groups of Egyptians ==
=== Gender differences ===
Nearly forty percent of all men in Egypt smoke while the percentage of reported women smokers stays low at less than two percent. Among men manufactured cigarettes were the most popular type of product, preferred by 31.7%, followed by shisha only preferred by 6.2%. On the other hand, among women 0.2% preferred manufactured cigarettes. Among daily cigarette smokers, men on average smoke 19.4 cigarettes a day while the figure for women is lower.

=== Women and smoking ===
An estimated two percent of Egyptian women smoke, however most researchers believe female smoking is greatly underreported due to social taboos that push female smoking into private areas. Such a rate is the lowest reported in countries in the Eastern Mediterranean region [4] and is lower than for women in other developing countries (range from 2% to 10%). The prevalence of smoking among women in Egypt, as elsewhere in the developing world, is expected to increase in view of the weakening of cultural norms, women's increased spending power and the tactics of the tobacco company in targeting women as new consumers.

=== Smoking in divergent age groups ===
The percentage of the population using any tobacco product increases to around 23% and nearly 26% among the productive age groups 25–44 and 45–64 years, respectively. The prevalence of using any tobacco product among all university graduates is about 16%. The percentage of using any tobacco product among those with no formal education or those with some primary level education was higher at around 21% and nearly 26%, respectively.

Among men, the proportion of ever-smokers peaked in the age group 45–54 years and the second highest figure was among the age group 35–44 years. This profile resembles another report from Egypt, where the peak was between 40 and 60 years of age. These two peaks may reflect the circumstances of earlier generations, who established their smoking habit 25 to 34 years ago during the beginning of the smoking epidemic in developing countries when scarce data were available to the public about the harmful consequences of tobacco.

== Quitting ==
In a survey conducted by the World Health Organization, they found that among every day smokers, 16.6% had quit smoking. Of the people who quit smoking over the past twelve months 41.1% had made an attempt to quit and 17.9% actually proved successful in quitting. Of the current population of smokers 42.8% expressed interest in quitting smoking. Of the 41.1% that tried to quit over the past twelve months, only 2.0% used pharmacotherapy and 4.0% used cessation counseling.

== See also ==
- Health in Egypt
