= Smoking in Iraq =

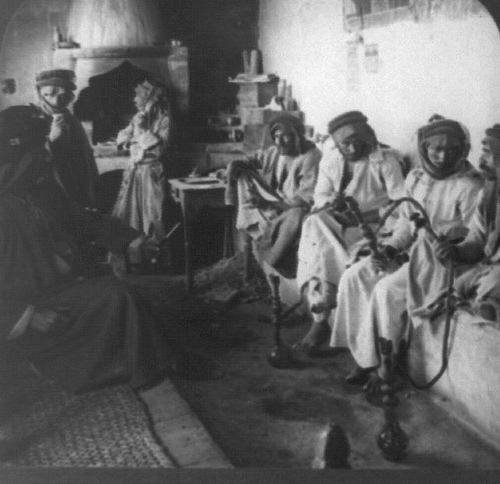
Men smoking hookah in Mosul, 1914

Smoking in Iraq is a widespread and culturally accepted behavior in Iraqi society. Since 2003 however there has been a greater push from the government to impose stricter rules. Since 2009 it is illegal to smoke in or around public buildings, although the ban remains unpopular with the Iraqi public and enforcement is inconsistent.

A 2015 study conducted by health advocates stated that and average of 55 Iraqis die daily due to tobacco related diseases. By comparison and average of 10 people a day are killed in Iraq due to terrorism and violence.

== History and prevalence ==
Tobacco consumption has historically been popular in the Arab region since the colonial era, but prevalence has increased significantly in Iraq since the Iran-Iraq War, and subsequent violence. The rates being at 31% for men and 4% for women. Smoking in the Kurdistan region are significantly lower at 15.3% with 25.1% and 2.7% regarding the rates for men and women respectively.

== Bans and legality ==
Theoretically tobacco advertisement is prohibited and it is illegal to smoke in public places and indoors, enforcement is iratic at best. A 2015 survey by the World Health Organization (WHO) found that there were multiple billboards throughout the capital Baghdad promoting tobacco, as well as in hospitals and schools. The same survey found that 13% of Iraqi districts had no funded cessation programs aimed at helping smokers quit.

Taxation by the government on cigarettes, although increasing, is comparatively low at less than 50%; most packs are sold for less than a US dollar.

== Public opinion ==
Smoking is seen by a significant segment of Iraq's population as a socially acceptable way to socialize and relax. Most religious leaders however are opposed to smoking and think it is un-Islamic.

== Smoking under ISIL ==
Smoking was banned in areas under ISIL occupation, with harsh punishment if violated. In areas that have been liberated smoking has come to be seen as a symbol of freedom and as a celebration of destroying ISIL existing where people publicly share cigarettes and smoke shisha in groups as a way of stating that ISIL is gone.

== See also ==
- Health in Iraq
