= Smoking in Argentina =

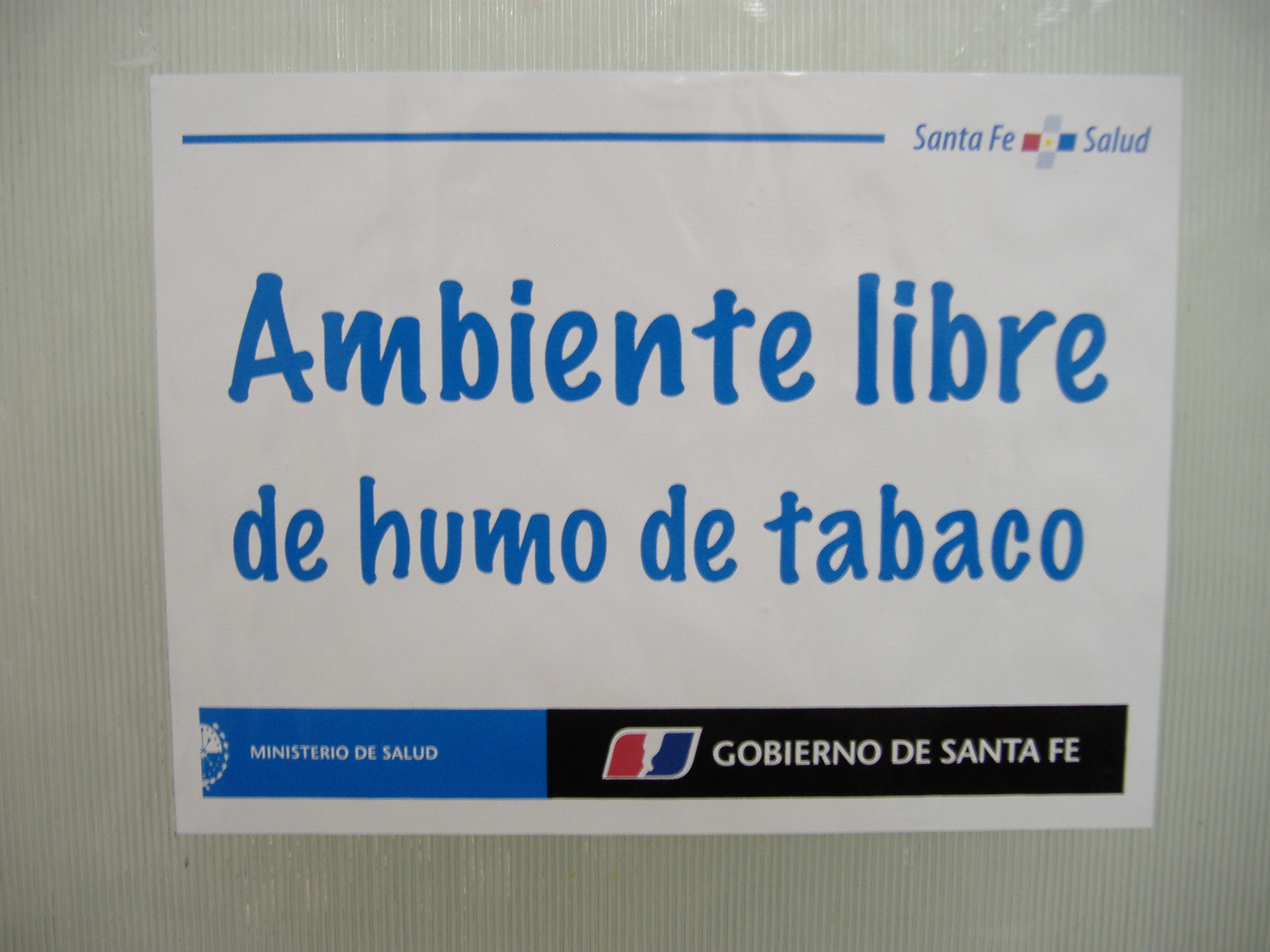
A sign in a government office in Rosario, Santa Fe: Tobacco smoke-free environment, reflecting provincial Ministry of Health regulations.

Smoking in Argentina accounts for 15% of total tobacco consumption in the Americas. In the 20th century, the government promoted settlement and economic development in the northern subtropical zones, with tobacco playing a central role. A new government agency worked to educate farmers and promote the cultivation, processing, and marketing of tobacco. While tobacco factories were initially concentrated around Buenos Aires, they gradually extended into the northern production regions. By 1960, Argentina accomplished self-sufficiency in tobacco production. By the 1970s, its annual output exceeded 60,000 metric tons, with one-third exported. At the local level cooperatives are active, they sell to one of two multinational companies, Nobleza-Picardo, an affiliate of the British American Tobacco company, and Messalin-Particulares, associated with Philip Morris International. Argentina held the global rank of third place in terms of production, trailing behind Brazil and Mexico.

There are a number of smoking restrictions in place in different jurisdictions, and a nationwide governmental campaign against tobacco smoking and advertising. Since June 1, 2011 a smoking ban in all of Argentina prohibits smoking in workplaces, all public indoor areas, schools, hospitals, museums and libraries, theatres, and all public transport.

In 2006, the prevalence of current tobacco use was 32% (35% among men, 29% among women). Approximately 90% of the population who smoked did so on a daily basis, and 30% smoked an average of 20 cigarettes per day. Tobacco causes 40,000 deaths per year, 6,000 due to secondhand smoke. The cost of the treatment of tobacco-related diseases amounts to 6020 million Argentine pesos ($1324 million USD) per year, 15.5% of the total public expenditure on health care. The government collects 3500 million pesos per year in taxes on cigarettes.

== Law ==
National Law 23344, passed on 29 August 1986, established restrictions on advertising and promotion of tobacco, and dictated that cigarette packs must include a legend warning that Smoking is harmful to health, but did not include sanctions against violations of the law; these were added later, and then partially vetoed.

== WHO Framework Convention ==
In September 2003 Argentina signed the WHO Framework Convention on Tobacco Control, though ratification was delayed by two years. Analysts blame tobacco industry interests for this delay, as with previous failures in implementing serious anti-smoking policies.

== Legislative deadlock ==
As of 2006, a proposal to prohibit smoking in all public and enclosed spaces, sent by the Executive to the National Congress in August 2005, was awaiting consideration. Legislative lobbying from the tobacco industry proposed an alternative, weaker law, championed by Jujuy Province Senator Liliana Fellner, who called herself "the voice of the [tobacco] producers" (Jujuy is one of the seven tobacco-producing provinces in Argentina).

== Public sentiment ==
A nationwide telephone survey published in August 2006 showed overwhelming support of the population for laws that establish "smoke-free spaces" in public spaces such as offices, factories, shopping malls and banks (93.4% overall support, 85% among smokers), and that completely forbid smoking in schools, universities and hospitals (97%). More than three quarters among the surveyed (including almost two thirds of the smokers) also supported smoking bans for bars and restaurants.

== Provincial and municipal laws on smoking ==
In 2003, according to national sources, 75% of the Argentine provinces had some form of smoke-free legislation. Either in addition to or in the absence of provincial laws, many municipalities have local regulations to the same effect. Fines might be established for trespassers (tobacco companies, businesses and private individuals). The actual application of this legislation varies considerably.

- In Santa Fe it is forbidden to smoke in enclosed public spaces (offices, restaurants) and to sell tobacco to minors since 2005. (Provincial Law 12432)
- In La Rioja and Chubut it is forbidden to smoke in enclosed spaces and in public offices.
- In Mendoza there are also "smoke-free spaces" in schools, hospitals and other public buildings.
- In Córdoba (Provincial Law 9113, Córdoba Municipal Order 11039) and Tucumán (Provincial Law 7575), smoking bans for public places are in effect since mid-2006.
- In Buenos Aires City it is forbidden to smoke in government offices and (since October 2006) in all public enclosed spaces, except in businesses of more than 100 m² where smoking areas have been set up. (Law 1799)
- Chaco, Neuquén, Tierra del Fuego and Salta have similar laws.

== See also ==
- Health in Argentina
- Tobacco in Latin America
