= Smoking in Ecuador =

Smoking in Ecuador is more common among men and younger people. According to a study in 2004, 49.4% of men and 13.1% of women smoke. More than half of Ecuadorian smokers desire to quit. The Government of Ecuador plans to reduce second-hand smoke in public spaces by 2012. The tobacco industry in Ecuador includes the major players of Tabacalera Andina SA (a subsidiary of Philip Morris International Inc) and British American Tobacco (South America) Ltd. Smoking is expected to decrease as the government enacts laws and the public becomes more aware of the dangers of smoking. Smoking is common in bars and dance clubs, but non-smoking signs in restaurants in Quito are generally respected.

In 2006, Ecuador adopted the WHO Framework Convention on Tobacco Control, emphasizing Smoke-Free environments, reforms on tobacco promotion and marketing, product packaging and labeling, and clear plans to enact laws to promote tobacco cessation.

In 2011, the Ecuadorian Parliament adopted the Tobacco Control and Regulation Bill to enforce strict regulations on the promotion and marketing of tobacco products. It also included a ban on smoking in enclosed public spaces, workplaces, sporting events, health facilities, educational establishments, and public transportation. Sales from vending machines or sales to minors were also banned. Pictorial warnings on the health consequences of tobacco use are required to cover at least 60% of product packaging. Later in the year, the government raised its taxation on tobacco, becoming the nation with the highest rate in Latin America.

== See also ==
- Health in Ecuador
