= Smoking in Greece =

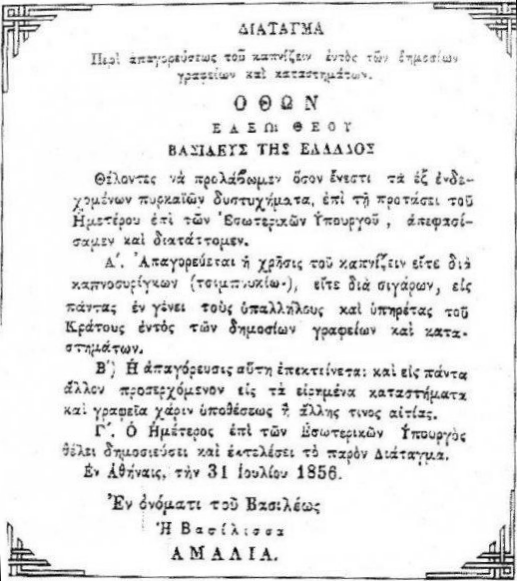
Royal decree of 1856, introducing the first ban on smoking in modern Greece. Prohibition was valid only within state buildings and was grounded on the need to prevent accidents.

Tobacco smoking has historically been culturally ingrained in Greece, and it continues to be a socially acceptable pastime in many parts of the country to this day. According to a 2024 survey, Greece has among the highest smoking rates in the European Union. As of 2022, 29.6% of Greek adults are daily smokers. According to a survey published by the European Commission Day for World No Tobacco Day in 2017, 37% of Greeks were current smokers; only 44% of Greeks responded they have never smoked a cigarette—the smallest percentage in the EU. After Greece, Bulgaria and France have the next highest rates of smoking.

== 2010 smoking ban ==
Since older legislation was not effective, a new, stricter law was passed. With effect of 1 September 2010, this law banned smoking and the consumption of tobacco products by other means, in all work places, transport stations, taxis and passenger ships (smoking was already prohibited on trains, buses and aeroplanes), as well as in all enclosed public places including restaurants, night clubs, etc., without any exception. Smoking is also prohibited in atria and internal areas with removable roof covers or tents as well as in external seating areas that are surrounded by a tent and are not open from at least two sides. Fines are particularly heavy for smokers who do not comply (fines range from 50€ to 500€) as well as for work places or companies, i.e. restaurants, night clubs, pubs, etc. (fines range from 500€ to 10,000€). For those companies that violate the law for the fifth time in a row, the law requires the closure of the company.

As with previous legislation, this new law also remained unimplemented and smoking was in reality permitted in most public places. Signage indicating the smoking ban legislation was commonly ignored.

== Effects of the smoking ban ==
Even eight years after the second phase of the ban supposedly went into effect, in July 2011, there was little evidence of the culture changing. Based on a pamphlet distributed in January 2018 by the Ministry of Health, strict fines were in place for those smoking illegally. The manager of every space that violates the anti-smoking ban, for vendors of tobacco products to those underage and for those violating the advertising laws for tobacco products risked fines between 500 and 10,000€. On a shop's fourth violation, its licence would be suspended for ten days, while after the fifth violation it would be revoked permanently. Furthermore, the law stated that a driver may be fined up to 1,500€ for smoking with a minor (under 12 years of age) on board, regardless of who was smoking and it may be doubled if it is a public sector vehicle, such as a bus. Drivers may have their licences suspended for a month after each violation.

However, these provisions were almost never enforced, because they were almost never reported. According to the Municipality of Athens, regular checks were not carried out due to limits in their staff numbers.

== Greece-Harvard Anti-Smoking Initiative ==
The government signed an agreement with Harvard University to help in developing the government's anti-tobacco policies and mounting publicity campaigns. The Harvard School of Public Health will also help Greece conduct research, organize conferences and train all the officials who will be involved in imposing the ban. The Hellenic Action through Research Against Tobacco, known as HEART, has conducted clinical research on the impact of smoking, especially on pregnant women, the effects of second-hand smoke and assessing whether creating a draft and ventilation or opening windows and doors does eliminate exposure to second hand smoke thus far. The initiative also plans to raise awareness with children, as early as elementary school and create a smoke-free environment on all school grounds across the country.

== October 2019 onwards ==
Finally, in October 2019, the law was further amended to expressly include a ban on all "equivalent" products, such as vaping devices, e-cigarettes and other inhaled products in the aforementioned enclosed spaces plus large-surface nightclubs, which were previously exempted, and sheltered outdoor spaces of bars and restaurants that are not exposed at least on two sides. Moreover, the law was reinforced with provisions rendering the police authorities responsible for the enforcement of the ban, with even stricter fines for customers and businesses alike, with a helpline for complaints (initially by phone, now online) and with anti-smoking campaigns that assisted people to quit smoking. As a result, there has been a tremendous decrease in passive smoking in Greece, with only few certain private establishments notoriously attempting to ignore the law and risk fines, as well as a trend towards quitting or cutting down on smoking.

A new amendment to the current law is envisaged to more accurately describe those sheltered outdoor areas of bars and restaurants that will be obliged to prohibit smoking (e.g. spaces protected with plastic sheeting, canopies and barriers) and to include chewing tobacco products.

== See also ==
- European Tobacco Products Directive
