= Health care in Argentina =

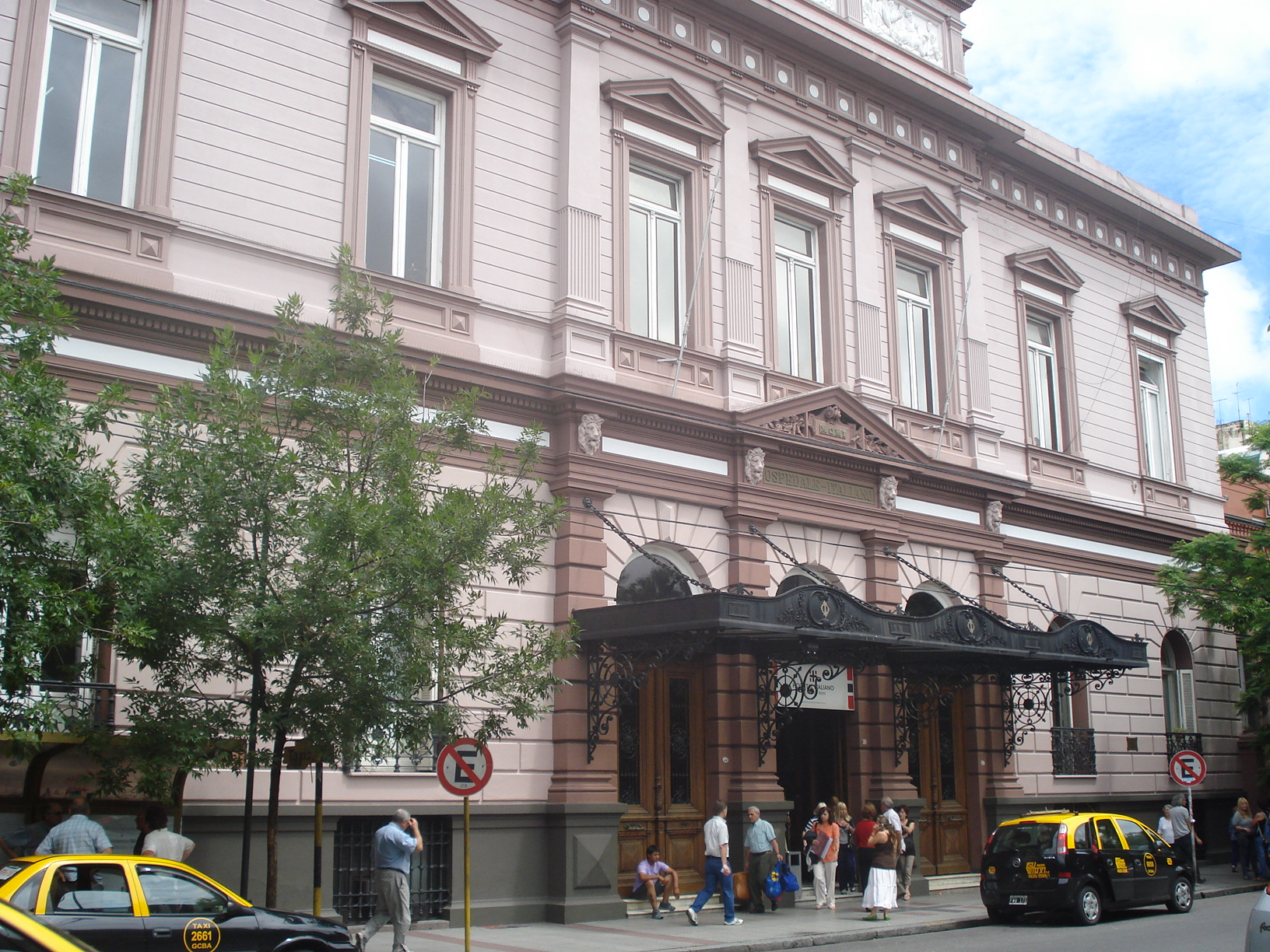
Hospital Italiano de Buenos Aires originally served the Italian Argentine community.

Life expectancy development in Argentina

Argentina's health care system is composed of a universal health care system and a private system. The government maintains a system of public medical facilities that are universally accessible to everyone in the country, but formal sector workers are also obligated to participate in one of about 300 labor union-run health insurance schemes, which offer differing levels of coverage. Private medical facilities and health insurance also exist in the country. The Ministry of Health (MSAL), oversees all three subsectors of the health care system and is responsible for setting of regulation, evaluation and collecting statistics.

== History ==
For the first half of the 20th century Argentina and Uruguay had the most advanced standards of medical care in Latin America. Argentina's current healthcare system was created during a time of strong economic growth in the nation. This economic reform was completed during the urbanization, industrialization, and labor movement eras of the 1940s to 1950s. Since that time, Argentina's healthcare system has been extensively decentralized and privatized to provide support at the provincial level.

== Spending ==
In 2016, Argentina spent 7.5% of its GDP on health care expenditures. In 2020, Argentina is estimated to have spent about 10% of its GDP on health care.

== Health care ==
In January 2013, the Federal Registry of Health Establishments (Registro Federal de Establecimientos de Salud - REFES) indicated there were 5,012 health establishments operating in Argentina, including hospitals, clinics, and hospices, amongst others. The majority of the establishments (70% or 3,494 establishments) pertain to the private sector.

=== Social Security ===
The Social Security Sector is funded and managed by Obras Sociales (Insurance Plans), umbrella organizations for Argentine worker's unions. There are over 300 Obras Sociales in Argentina, each chapter being organized according to the occupation of the beneficiary. These organizations vary greatly in quality and effectiveness. The top 30 chapters hold 73% of the beneficiaries and 75% of resources Health Care in Latin America. MSAS has established a Solidarity Redistribution Fund (FSR) to try to address these beneficiary inequities. Only workers employed in the formal sector are covered under Obras Sociales insurance schemes and after Argentina’s economic crisis of 2001, the number of people covered by these fell slightly (as unemployment increased and employment in the informal sector rose). In 1999, there were 8.9 million beneficiaries covered by Obras Sociales.

There is a body within the social security sector in Argentina called "The Superintendence of Health Services" La Superintendencia de Servicios de Salud, which is in charge of setting the minimum coverage package that is included in the health insurance of every single health-care institution. This allows for a more transparent set of criteria for decision-making process within a sector of the Argentinean health-care system.

Prior to 2000, workers did not have the freedom of choosing which Obra Social they contributed to and were covered by. This situation gave rise to some problems; e. g. a teacher living in a city where the gastronomy workers' Obra Social provided better care than the teachers union's Obra Social could not freely switch plans even when it would have been in their best interest. This was mended in the year 2000 when National Decree 446/2000 was signed into law which established changes to the regulation of Obras Sociales, allowing for workers to choose freely between Obras Sociales administered by different workers unions (although they are still obligated to adhere to one of the Obras and make regular payments).

=== Private sector ===
The private health care sector in Argentina is characterized by great heterogeneity and is made up of a great number of fragmented entities and small networks; it consists of over 200 organizations and covers approximately 2 million Argentines. Private insurance often overlaps with other forms of health care coverage, making it difficult to estimate the degree to which beneficiaries are dependent on the public and private sectors. According to a 2000 report by the IRBC, foreign competition has increased in Argentina’s private sector, with Swiss, American and other Latin American health care providers entering the market in recent years. This has been accompanied by little formal regulation.

=== Public system ===
A system of public medical facilities is maintained by the government. The public system is highly decentralized, as it is administered at the provincial level; often primary care will be regulated autonomously by each city. Since 2001, the number of Argentines relying on public services has seen an increase. According to 2000 figures, 37.4% of Argentines had no health insurance, 48.8% were covered by Obras Sociales, 8.6% had private insurance plans, and 3.8% were covered by both Obras Sociales and private insurance schemes. Currently, about half of the population uses the public system.

== Health Policies ==
Patients need to apply for free care at public institutions and undergo a lengthy test in which they may be rejected at some hospitals. The rejection rate is usually 30-40%. Public hospitals in Argentina who have not converted to managed care principles are facing an influx of patients covered by privatized social security funds. Public hospitals in the city of Buenos Aires reported about 1.25 million outpatient visits by patients covered by the privately administered social security fund for retired person. The Provincial and Municipal Health Secretariats and Social works through the Superintendence of Health Services are in charge of allocation of resources and setting priorities. The Ministry of Health through its Sub-secretariat of Promotion and Prevention are in charge of Public Health Interventions. Local Health Secretariats in the provinces and municipalities through the department of purchases in the public sub-sector and individual social works are in charge of the reimbursement of new drugs.

Elderly people face barriers due to copayments, private practitioners' refusal to see them and also because of nonpayment by the social security fund.

== See also ==
- List of hospitals in Argentina
- Argentine hemorrhagic fever
- Water supply and sanitation in Argentina
- Smoking in Argentina
- Universal healthcare
- Argentina Health Care Organization
