= Smoking in Ireland =

Smoking tobacco in Ireland is legally permitted, however it is banned in the general workplace, enclosed public places, restaurants, bars, education facilities, healthcare facilities and public transport. However, it is allowed in designated hotel rooms and there is no ban in residential care, prisons and in outdoor areas.

The ban was implemented in 2004, making Ireland the first country in the world with comprehensive national smoke-free work-place legislation. Public opinion is in favour of the bans on smoking which are in place in Ireland.

As of the 2022 census, over 60% of the population reported they had never smoked tobacco (3,113,712), 19% had given up smoking (974,145), less than 10% smoked daily (449,703), with 4% of the population (226,484) smoking "occasionally".

== Regulations ==
Irish law prohibits smoking fully in the general workplace, enclosed public places, restaurants, bars, education facilities, healthcare facilities and public transport. Smoking rooms are permitted in hotels.

As of July 2009, it is prohibited to advertise cigarettes and sell 10-packs of cigarettes in retail outlets. Additionally, as of February 2013, any tobacco product placed on the market must have graphic warnings. Legislation was also introduced to require plain tobacco packaging. This legislation came into force in 2017, making Ireland the fourth country in the world to mandate the removal of all logos and other forms of branding from packaging, requiring that they be sold in a plain, neutral colour.

=== Bans on smoking ===
Smoking in workplaces in Ireland was banned on 29 March 2004. From that date onwards, under the Public Health (Tobacco) Acts, it has been illegal to smoke in all enclosed workplaces. The ban is strictly enforced and includes bars, restaurants, clubs, offices, public buildings, company cars, trucks, taxis and vans. A private residence is considered a workplace when tradespeople, such as plumbers or electricians, are working there. €3,000 is the maximum fine on the spot, while a prison sentence can also be given at a later time for violators. The law exempts dwellings, prisons, nursing homes, psychiatric wards, hotel rooms, charitable accommodation and college dorm rooms. Certain buildings such as some hospitals forbid smoking anywhere in the grounds.

Before the 2004 law, smoking was already outlawed in public buildings, hospitals, schools, restaurant kitchens, cinemas, public pharmacies, public hairdressing premises, public banking halls, and on public transport aircraft and buses and some trains (Intercity trains provided smokers' carriages).

Premises must display a sign to inform patrons of the ban (in Irish or English), and the contact person for any complaints. A workplace can be given a fine of €3,000 for each person that is found smoking (this means €15,000 for 5 people in violation). Smoking rooms are not allowed. Any shelter can not have more than 50 percent coverage of walls. There is also a Compliance Line set up by the Office of Tobacco Control, that people can call to report people smoking in a workplace or retail outlets selling tobacco to under-18s.

On 18 July 2008, Irish Fine Gael MEP Avril Doyle proposed in a committee in the European Parliament, that she would like to see an EU-wide ban on cigarettes and cigars by 2025.

=== Cigarette packaging and advertising regulations ===
On 1 July 2009, Ireland banned in-store tobacco advertising and displays of tobacco products at retail outlets and new controls on tobacco vending machines (limiting them to being token-operated in registered bars and clubs only) were also introduced. At the same time a ban on the sale of packets of 10 cigarettes was introduced. Tobacco advertising had already been banned from radio, television and on billboards beforehand. The changes now mean that tobacco products must now be stored out of sight in closed containers behind the counter (accessible by retail staff only) and customers can be shown a card showing all available brands in a pictorial list if they wish to purchase cigarettes. Signs must also be shown informing customers that tobacco is sold at the premises. Ireland was the first country in the EU and third in the world (after Canada and Iceland) to introduce such measures, which are punishable with a fine of €3,000 and/or a six-month prison sentence. However, specialist tobacco shops (of which there are fewer than six) are exempt from the new rules; all retailers selling tobacco must register with the Health Service Executive and the new laws will be enforced by environmental health officers.

As of 1 February 2013, any tobacco product placed on the market must have graphic warnings. The Minister for Health, Dr. James Reilly's proposal to introduce plain tobacco packaging was approved by the Cabinet. As of September 2017 all cigarette packaging must be sold without branding or logos and feature plain packaging.

=== Ban on smoking in private vehicles ===
Since 2009, Irish anti-smoking campaigners and scientists had been urging the government to introduce a ban on smoking in private vehicles. In July 2011, the then Minister for Health said that he was considering a ban where children are present in the car. The senator and oncologist John Crown put a bill before parliament in 2012 to ban smoking in a car with children. This bill was passed into law in December 2014 with an expectation that enforcement by Gardaí would commence in 2015. The act took effect from 1 January 2016.

== Litigation ==
In the decision Delahunty v Player and Willis (Ireland) Ltd., the Supreme Court of Ireland ruled that an Irish citizen has the right to seek damages against tobacco companies.

== Public opinion ==
The public, according to a Flash Eurobarometer poll conducted by the Gallup Organisation in 2008 for the European Commission, is in favour of a full ban on smoking in restaurants, bars, pubs, clubs, offices and other indoor workplaces.

Flash Eurobarometer poll from 2008 for the EC
	Italy	(Republic of Ireland) Ireland	(European Union) EU27	Austria	Czech Republic
Totally in favour of ban in restaurants	88%	78%	63%	38%	58%
Totally in favour of ban in bars, pubs and clubs	87%	70%	47%	24%	27%
Totally in favour of ban in offices and other indoor workplaces	88%	79%	73%	66%	41%

A poll, conducted on behalf of the Irish Heart Foundation in 2023, suggested that 76% of Irish people support a total phasing-out of tobacco sales in the country.

== See also ==
- European Tobacco Products Directive
- Cannabis in Ireland
