= Sláinte (disambiguation) =

Sláinte (also Slàinte) is a toast in Irish and Scottish Gaelic meaning "health."

Sláinte may also refer to:

- Sláinte, former name of Mooncoyne, an American Celtic band
  - Sláinte (album), their eponymous 1997 album
- Slí na Sláinte, a walking initiative by the Irish heart foundation
- Sláinte, former name of The BibleCode Sundays, a London Celtic rock band
- "Slàinte Mhath", a song from the Marillion album Clutching at Straws
