= Opaque Couché =

Opaque Couché may refer to:

- Pantone 448 C, a colour in the Pantone colour system, described as a "drab dark brown"
- Opaque Couché (Meat Beat Manifesto Album), a 2019 album by Meat Beat Manifesto
