= Cigarette packets in Australia =

Location-specific item packaging

A sample package: a variety of warning packages are in use.

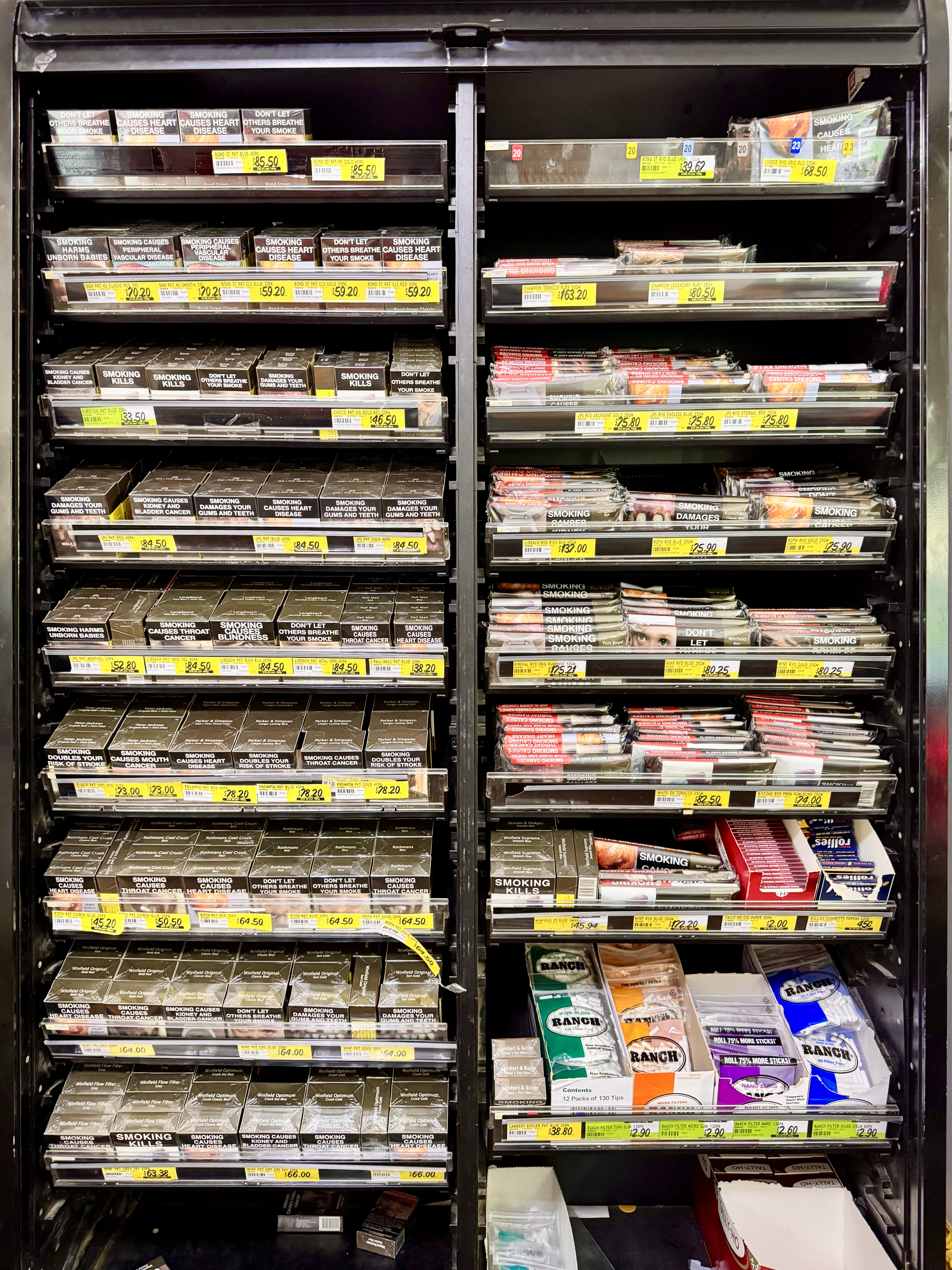
Display of cigarette packets in an Australian shop.

Cigarette packets in Australia have undergone significant changes. Since 1 December 2012, all forms of branding logos, colours, and promotional texts are banned from cigarette pack designs. In turn they were replaced with drab dark brown packets (Pantone 448 C) and graphic images with smoking-related themes to try to reduce the smoking population of Australia to 10% by 2018 from 15% in 2012.

In addition to other public health measures, packaging requirements have further decreased the prevalence and uptake of smoking, and have reduced cigarette sales in Australia.

== History ==
In 1973, Australia's first health warning on cigarette packages appeared with the simple message 'WARNING — SMOKING IS A HEALTH HAZARD'. Since 1 March 2006, graphic images depicting the effects of smoking cigarettes have been required to be displayed on cigarette packets. Warnings must cover 30% of the front and 90% of the back of the box. The 10% of the back not occupied by a warning is used for the message "Sale to underage persons prohibited".

Since 1 December 2012 all forms of branding logos, colours, and promotional texts are banned from cigarette pack designs. The requirement is for plain cigarette packaging showing only brand name and health warning messages. Australia was the first country to have plain packaging cigarette packs. At the same time the plain packets were introduced, the size of the anti-smoking images became larger, so the two effects are difficult to separate.

In 2025, the plain cigarette packing regulation was updated to tobacco products including new information cards inside cigarette packaging.

Canada was the first country to use graphic pictures in conjunction with written warnings on cigarette packages, with the legislation coming in 2000.

== Warnings ==
For cigarette packets, warnings include:

- Smoking causes peripheral vascular disease
- Smoking causes emphysema
- Smoking causes mouth and throat cancer
- Smoking clogs your arteries
- Don't let children breathe your smoke
- Smoking - A leading cause of death
- Quitting will improve your health
- Smoking harms unborn babies
- Smoking causes blindness
- Smoking causes lung cancer
- Smoking causes heart disease
- Smoking doubles your risk of stroke
- Smoking is addictive
- Tobacco smoke is toxic

With each warning is an accompanying graphic, and detailed information on the back of the packet. In addition, cigar and loose tobacco packets show other, slightly altered warnings. These warnings target the misconception that alternative, non-cigarette tobacco products are less harmful.

There have been calls to expand the range of warnings to reflect current research into the effects of smoking, such as impacts on fertility.

Australian cigarette packaging laws also prohibit the use of terms such as 'light', 'mild', 'extra mild', etc. The three major Australian tobacco manufacturers agreed to stop using these terms, after investigation of complaints of misleading and deceptive terms were made to the Australian Competition & Consumer Commission (ACCC) in 2005. This has assisted in counteracting the belief that some cigarette varieties are less harmful than others. To the same effect, while the carbon monoxide, nicotine and tar content of particular brands of cigarettes used to be mandated, the display and/or advertisement of these figures is now prohibited under the government's "All Cigarettes are Toxic" campaign.

In 2014, a population-wide, interrupted time-series analysis concludes there was a significant increase of calls to Quitline in some states not attributable to other factors that would suggest plain packaging might encourage smokers to attempt or at least seek help with quitting smoking.

In 2018, the World Trade Organization (WTO) Panel Report on Australia's Tobacco Plain Packaging (TPP) policy determined that "there is some econometric evidence suggesting that the TPP measures, in combination with the enlarged GHWs implemented at the same time, contributed to the reduction in wholesale cigarette sales, and therefore cigarette consumption, after their entry into force" and that, overall, the decrease in cigarette sales accelerated after TPP measures based on a review of the evidence regarding tobacco sales.

In 2020, an World Trade Organization Appellate Body (WTOAB) assessment of the Panel's findings upheld the findings of the Panel regarding the effect of TPP on reducing smoking prevalence and cigarette consumption, concluding that "while the appellants may disagree with the Panel's review of the factual evidence, as well as its conclusion, the Panel's explanation for how it reviewed the evidence and its reasons for its ultimate conclusion are quite clearly expressed. There is no doubt, in our view, about how and why the Panel concluded that "[t]he downward trend in cigarette sales in Australia appears to have accelerated in the post-TPP period."

== See also ==
- Smoking in Australia
- Plain tobacco packaging
- Tobacco packaging warning messages
- Health effects of tobacco
- Tobacco advertising
- Cigarette pack
- Pantone 448C
