= Cigarette pack =

Cigarette container

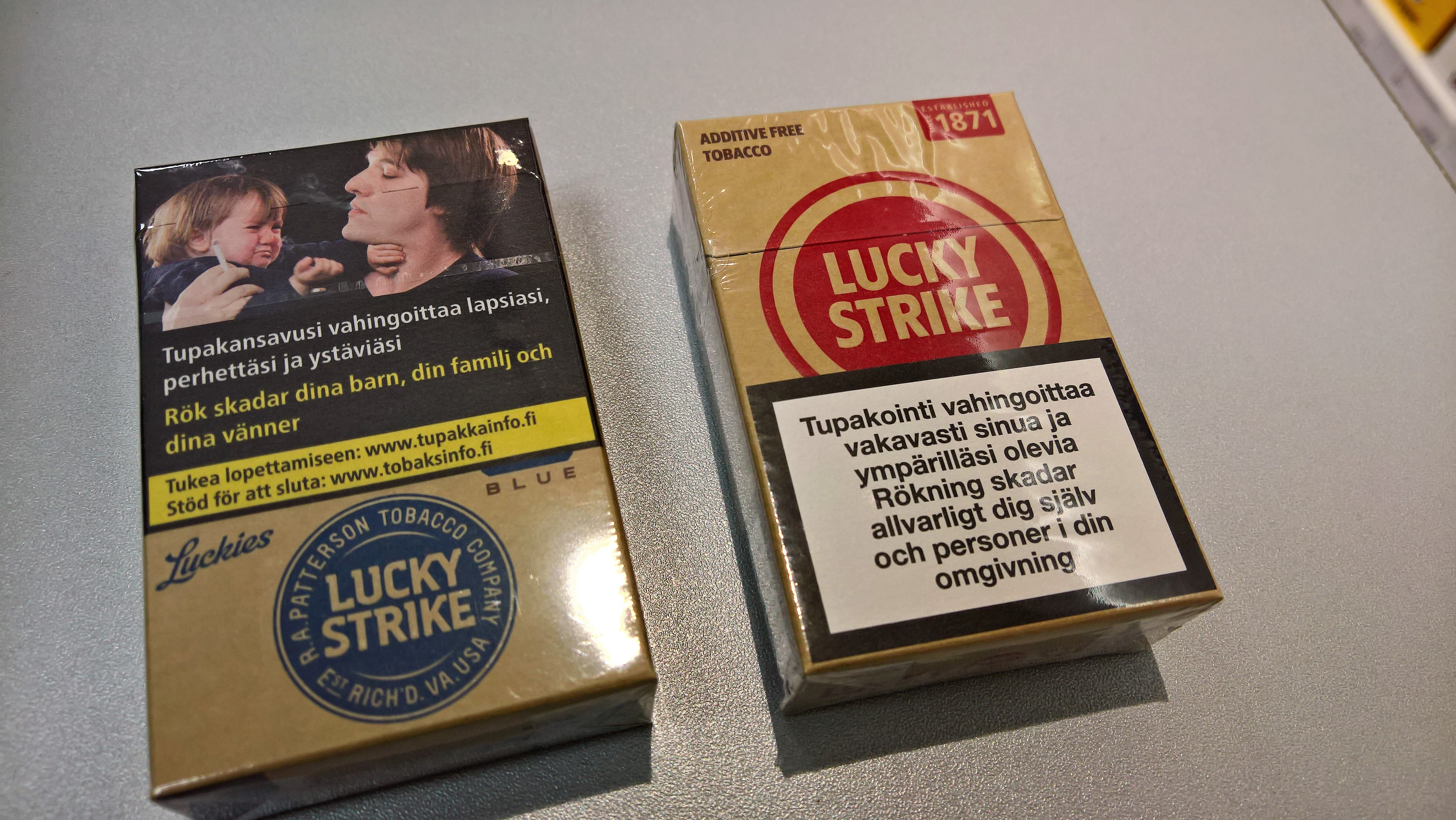
On the left, a new Finnish Lucky Strike cigarette pack by a new EU directive with warning photo; on the right, an obsolete pack as red. Some countries, such as France, the United Kingdom and Australia, go further in their regulations (plain packaging).

A pack or packet of cigarettes (also informally called fag packet in British slang; as in the idiom "back of a fag packet" or "fag-packet calculation") is a rectangular container, mostly of paperboard, which contains cigarettes. The pack is designed with a flavor-protective foil, paper or plastic, and sealed through a transparent airtight plastic film. By pulling the "pull-tabs", the pack is opened. Hard packs can be closed again after opening, whereas soft packs cannot.

Cigarette packs often contain warning messages depending on which country they are sold in. In the European Union, most tobacco warnings are standardised.

A patent has been granted for a cigarette package containing a container for disposal of cigarette butts.

== Package size ==
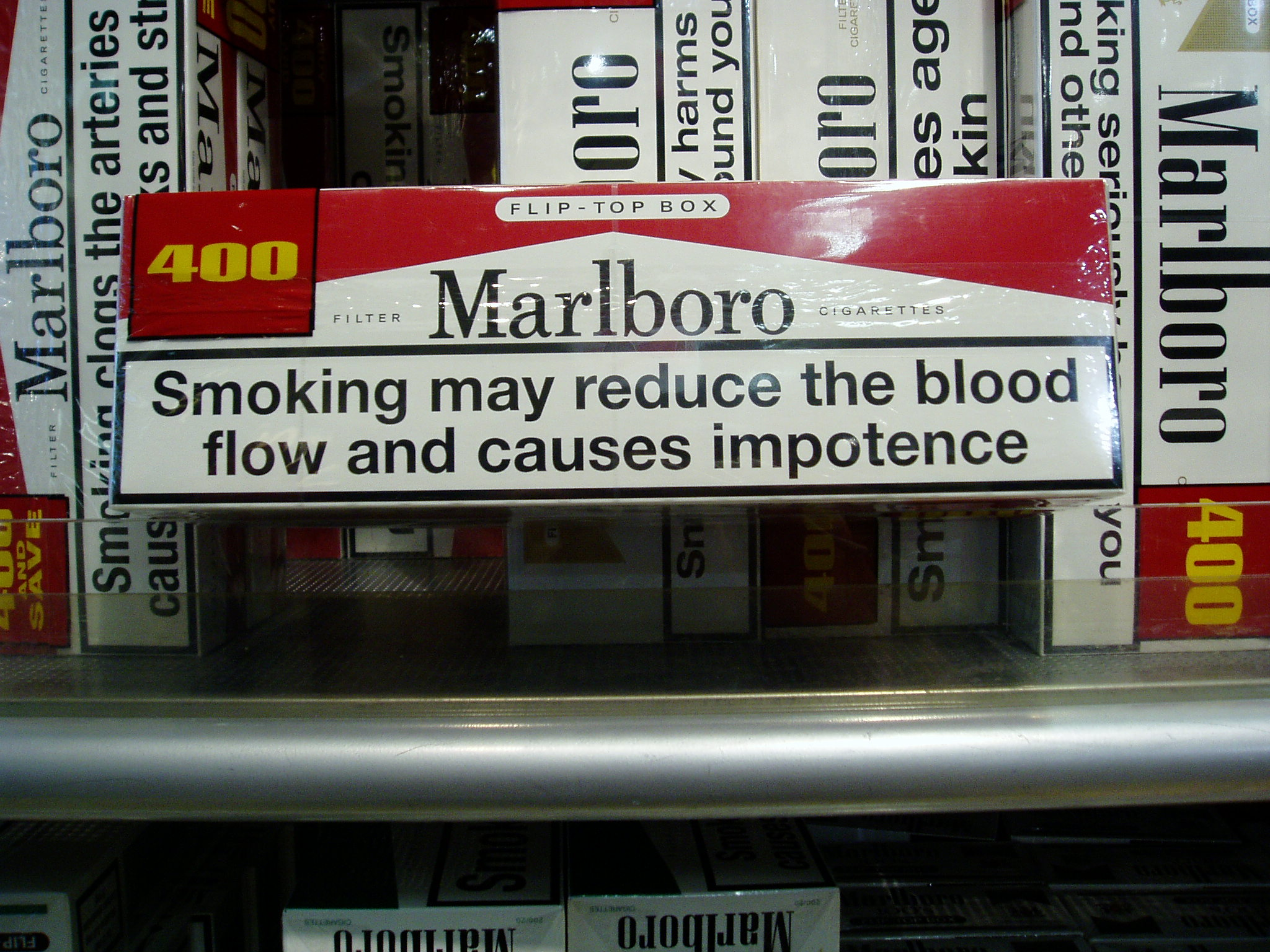
Box of 400 Marlboro cigarettes (Munich, Germany, 2006)

=== Pack ===
The size of a pack is often regulated. Government agencies usually set a minimum pack size.

In Australia, the most common quantity per pack is 25, but some brands have 26 or 20 (the legal minimum), with 30, 40 and even 50 packs also sold.

In Canada, most packs sold have 25 cigarettes, but packs of 20 are also popular.

In many European countries, increases of cigarette tax can cause the quantity of cigarettes in the pack to change to achieve the same end price.

In Malaysia, the sale of packs containing fewer than 20 cigarettes is prohibited.

In the United States, the quantity of cigarettes in a pack must be at least 20, with certain brands, such as Export A, coming in packs of 25.

In Ireland it is possible to buy cigarettes in packets of 27 or 33, but 20 remains most common.

In the United Kingdom, brands are sold only in packs of 20; in May 2017, new laws restricting loose tobacco sales to multiples of 30g or 50g also outlawed the sale of 10-stick packs and branded packaging, introducing boxes which are a plain green color.

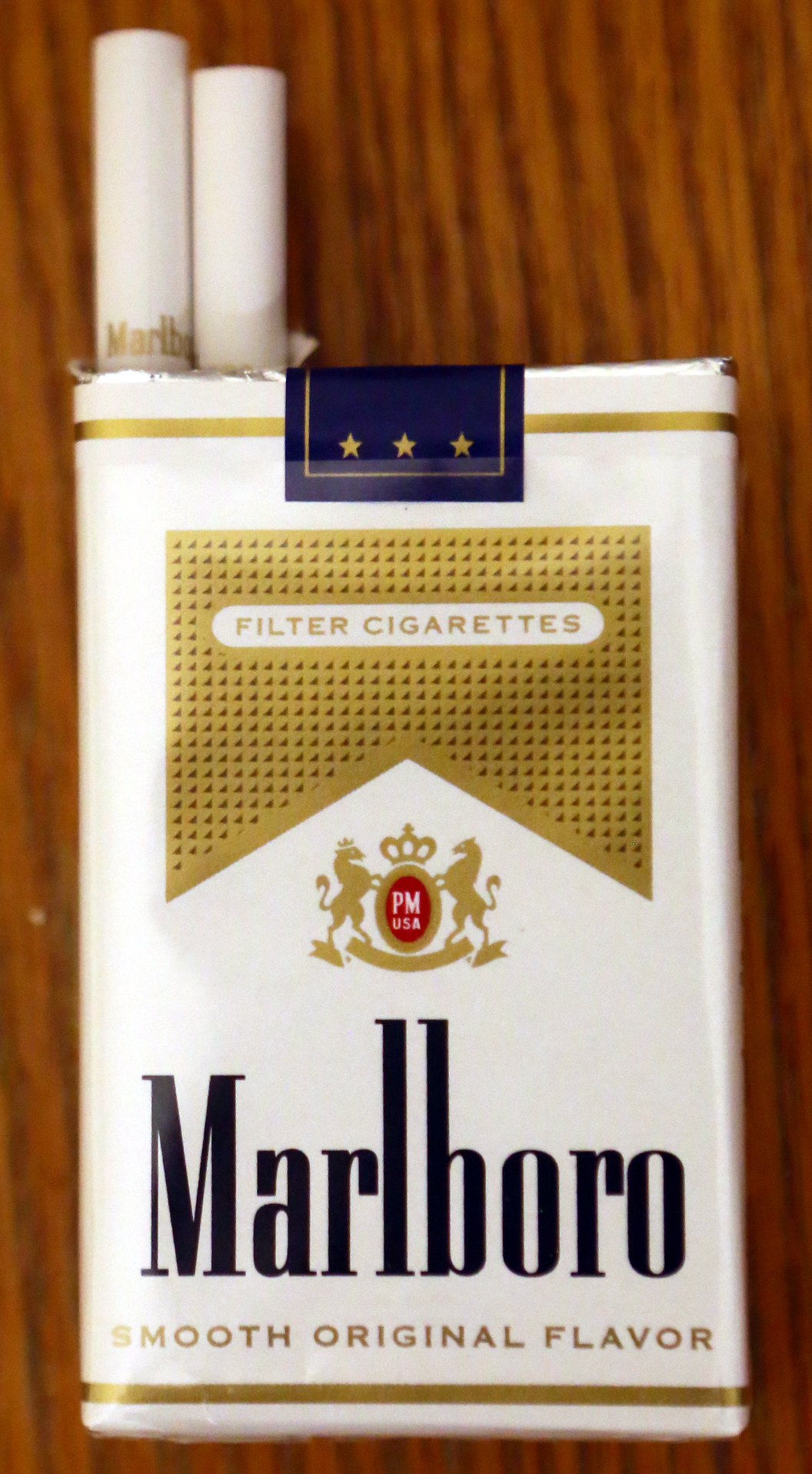
A soft pack of Marlboro Gold

The new packaging has the brand name in a basic typeface, with most of the packet dedicated to textual and photographic health warnings. While older vending machines sometimes dispense packets containing 16 or 18 cigarettes, the dimensions of the packaging are the same as the equivalent packet that contains 20.

=== Carton ===
A carton of cigarettes usually contains 10 packs, totaling 200 cigarettes. Some cartons contain twenty packs, totaling 400 cigarettes.

== Hard pack and soft pack ==
A hard pack is the usual style of paperboard packaging for store bought cigarettes, which consists of a relatively stable box. The flip-top hard pack cigarette case was introduced in 1955 by Philip Morris. This successfully prevents the crumpling of cigarettes when kept in a pocket or handbag. The hard pack is designed to make the smoker look at the brand name and logo on the top of the pack every time on opening, keeping the brand fresh in the consumer's mind and potentially increasing brand loyalty.

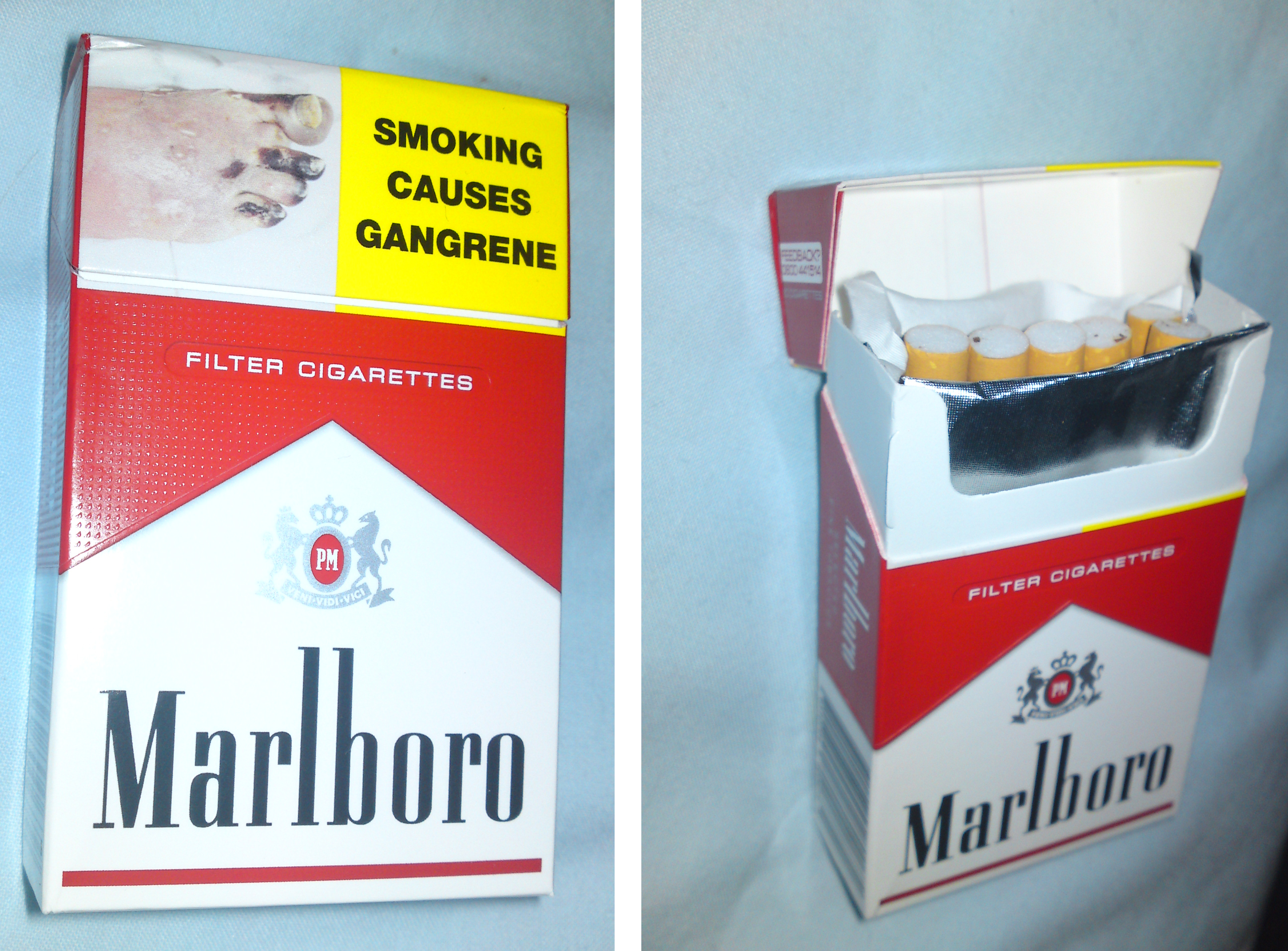
Flip-up top of a hard pack

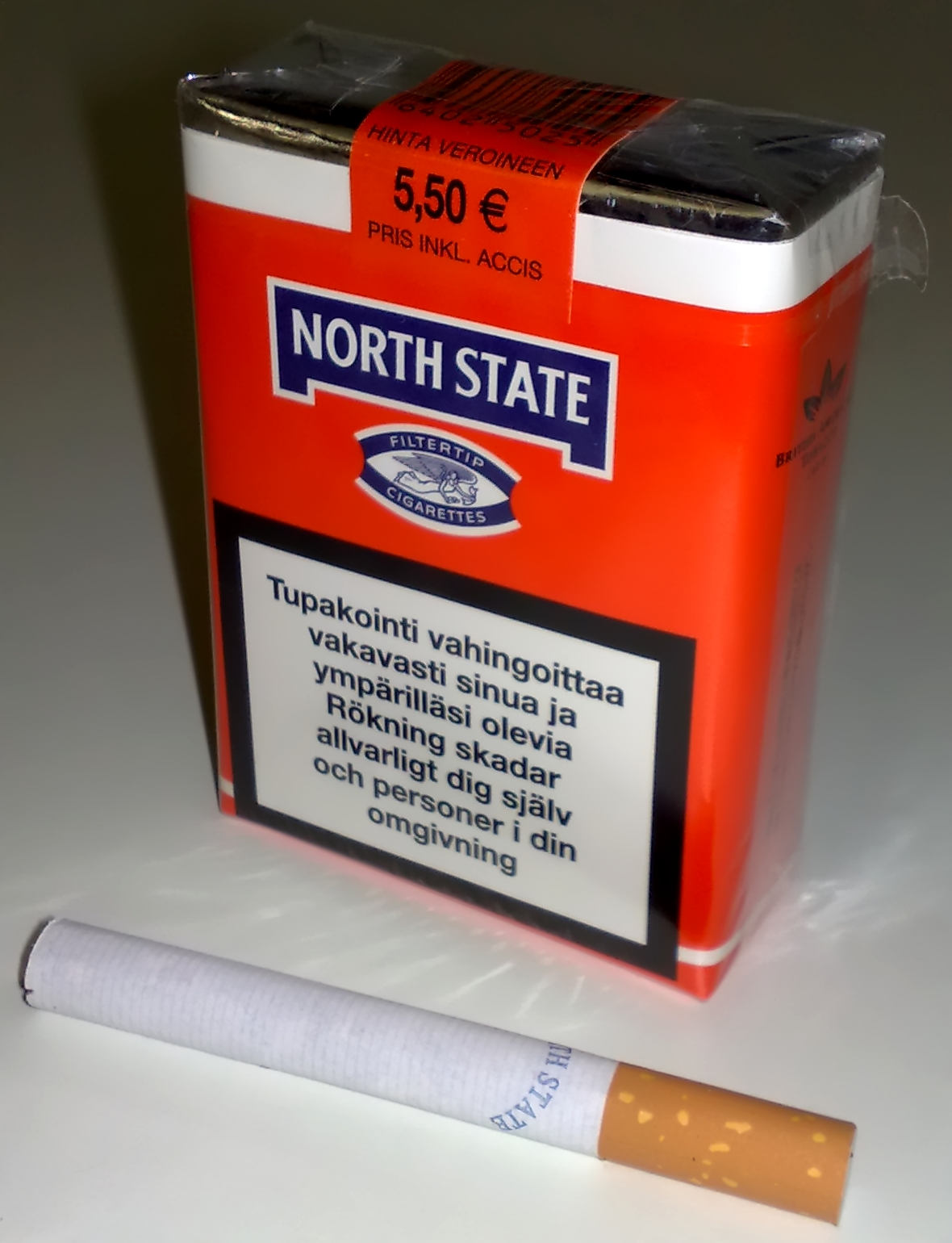
Soft pack

A soft pack is a box packaging made of thin paper, usually containing 20 cigarettes. Soft packs may be considered inconvenient as they rupture easily and cannot be resealed. They facilitate direct access, obviating the need to open the package each time the smoker wants a cigarette. They require less physical 'pocket space' when fewer cigarettes remain in the pack. With American brands, cigarettes from a soft pack are usually a few millimeters longer than their hard-boxed counterparts.

== Collecting ==
Cigarette packs are popular items among collectors. They are fine examples of industrial design and a good source for studies of social, cultural and marketing history. Collectors usually base their collections on various criteria like cigarette brand, country of producer, time period, warning message, etc. Also, it's important for collectors whether the packages are empty or full. Empty packs are more common and cheaper than full ones. Full packs are considered to be rare and therefore are often more expensive, especially packs in original cellophane wrapping.

=== Collectible pack ===
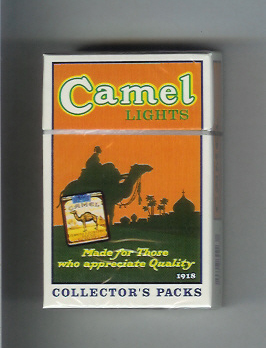
Camel Collector's Pack

To encourage cigarette pack collectors, some cigarette packs were made to present a particular interest for collectors. There are cigarette packs labeled "collectible".

Some brands introduce promotional packs to bypass advertising laws. An example would be a limited time promotion where the pack is made from tin with the shape, purpose, and look of a cigarette case to entice potential buyers. They are distinguished by unique décor or are very old or they were removed from manufacturing for some reasons and consequently became rare.

=== Cigarette brands from 1920 to 1930 ===
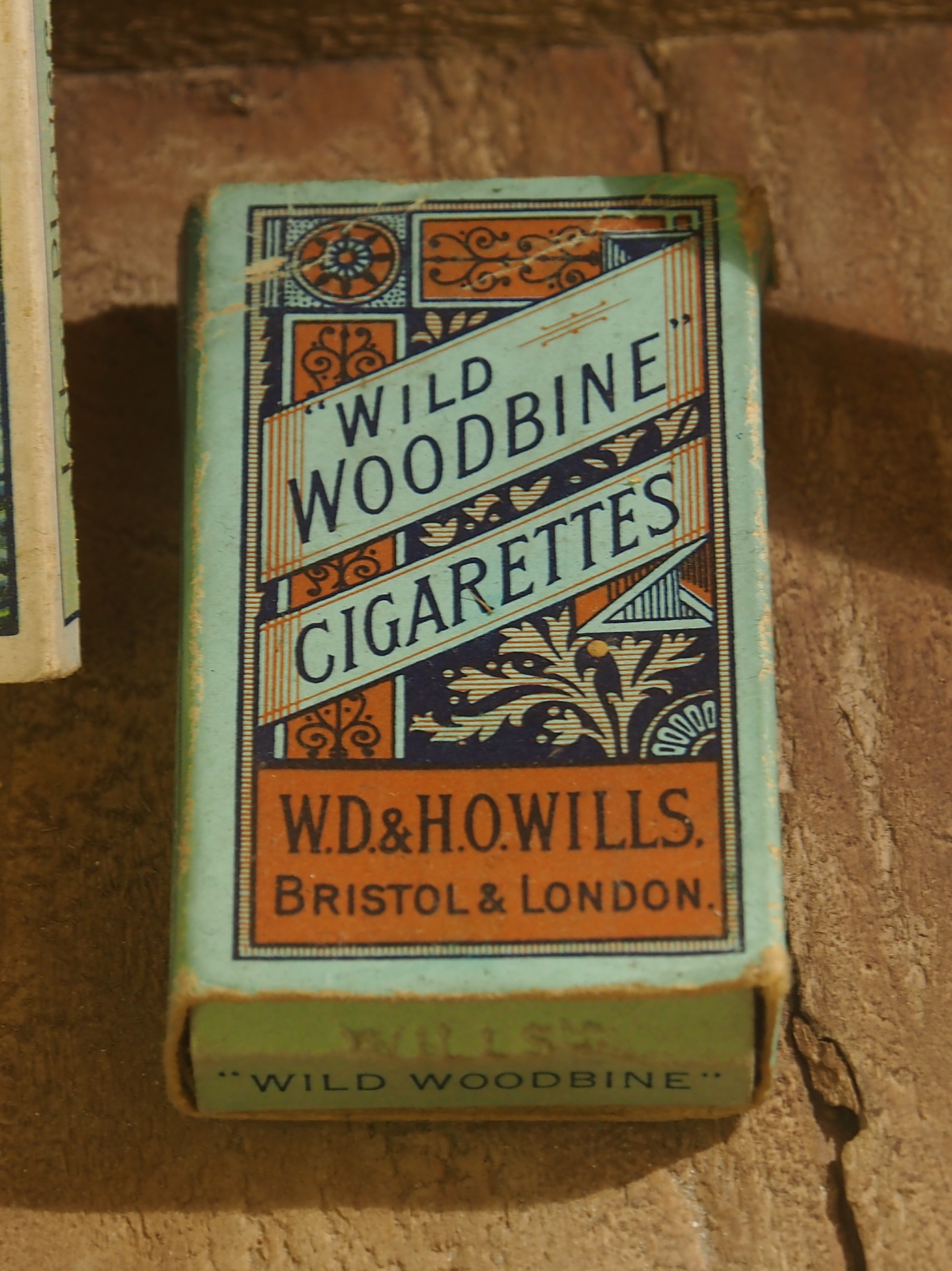
Wild Woodbine cigarette pack

The most popular cigarette brands of this period were Player's Navy Cut, Woodbine, Capstan, Craven 'A', and Black Cat. Woodbines were cheap cigarettes aimed at working-class people while Craven 'A' was one of the earliest filter brands initially targeted at women.

=== Cigarette brands from 1940s ===
The top-selling cigarette brands of the decade were Lucky Strike, Camel, Chesterfield, and Old Gold. That was the time of growth for the whole tobacco industry: again cigarettes were included in the soldier rations during World War II.

=== Cigarette brands from 1950s ===
The top-selling cigarette brands of the decade were the same as in the previous one except that the no.1 was Camel. The other brands were Balto, Brunette, Encore, Gitanes, and Kent. Cigarettes were widely advertised on TV.

== Plain tobacco packaging ==
Tobacco packaging drives brand image to attract new consumers to their tobacco products and creates brand loyalty. To give stylish impact to tobacco packaging companies use different techniques like gold and silver foiling, embossing, perforating, debussing, raised ink printing, digital printing, and screen printing. In general, tobacco packaging plays a major role in advertising and promotion of tobacco marketing.

Recent introduction of plain packaging contributes to improving public health because young people told that plain packaging reduces the positive image of smoking and the possibility of stimulus related to the package design.

The introduction of plain packages was considered as the end of cigarette pack collecting by some collectors as it made the packs unattractive. The other collectors adapted to the new reality and included variations of warning messages as one of the criteria for basing their collections on.
