= Cigarette box =

Cigarette box may refer to:

- Cigarette pack
- Cigarette case
