= Smoking in Malaysia =

Smoking in Malaysia was first dealt with in legislation requiring a general warning message on all Malaysian cigarette packaging in 1976. Smoking bans in public places started to be implemented in the 1980s. Selling of cigarettes to persons under the age of 18 has been forbidden since May 14, 1994. Tobacco advertising was outlawed in 2003; since January 1995, showing cigarette packaging in advertisements had been forbidden, and print media advertising had been restricted to only one page.

Malaysia is ranked 78th in per capita cigarette consumption, with an average of 441.2 cigarettes smoked per person aged 15 or older annually.

The smoking population doubled between the 1970s and 1995.

Malaysia became a Party to the WHO Framework Convention on Tobacco Control on December 15, 2005.

Smoking is technically banned in hospitals/clinics, airports, public lifts and toilets, air-conditioned restaurants, public transport, government premises, educational institutions, petrol stations, Internet cafes, shopping complexes and private office spaces with central air-conditioning; however, enforcement is an issue and is often very lax, many simply ignore the rule.

Starting 1 June 2010, it is an offence to smoke at private office spaces with central air-conditioning. Smokers flouting the ban may be fined up to RM10,000, or two years of imprisonment.

At September 2016, the Ministry of Health of Malaysia aims to reduce numbers of smokers in Malaysia for over 15% as about 3 billion MYR was spent due to the increasing of chronic cancer.

As of 1 January 2019, it is illegal to smoke in all restaurants and eateries in Malaysia. Owners of restaurants who fail to display a no-smoking sign can face fines of up to RM3,000, or a prison sentence of six months.

== Prevalence ==
About 23.3% of Malaysians aged 15 and above reported being current tobacco users in 2019. Malaysia was reported to have one of the highest prevalence e-cigarettes users at 14% by the International Tobacco Control Policy Evaluation Project (ITC Project) in comparison to other countries including Australia, United States, Canada and China.

== Illegal cigarettes issue ==
Malaysia has now set the minimum price for legitimate cigarettes, which as of 2016, is MYR 17 and must have at least 20 sticks. Illicit cigarettes, however, can be sold at a lower price and can have fewer than 20 sticks in each pack. The number of legal cigarettes has declined due to illicit cigarettes since its peak in 2003.

== Trans-Pacific Partnership lobby ==
In 2013, Malaysia proposed exempting tobacco from the Trans-Pacific Partnership's trade protections.

== See also ==
- List of smoking bans
- Plain tobacco packaging
