= Tobacco Products Directive =

2014 European Union directive

The Tobacco Products Directive (TPD) or European Tobacco Products Directive (EUTPD) (2014/40/EU) is a directive of the European Union which places limits on the sale and merchandising of tobacco and tobacco-related products in the EU. The TPD aims to improve the functioning of the internal market, while ensuring health protection for European citizens. Based on the proposal of the European Commission the Directive entered into force on 19 May 2014 and became applicable in the EU Member States on 20 May 2016.

== History ==
The WHO Framework Convention on Tobacco Control is effective since 2005.

In 2009, the European Commission decided to revise the 2001 Tobacco Products Directive.

The new Tobacco Products Directive was adopted in 2014 and is applicable in the member states since 2016.

== Content ==
This Directive applies to the manufacture, presentation, and sale of tobacco related products including cigarettes, roll your own tobacco, pipe tobacco, cigars, cigarillos, smokeless tobacco, electronic cigarettes, and herbal products for smoking. To address this situation, the European Union and its Member States have taken various tobacco control measures in the form of legislation, recommendations and information campaigns. The rules include:

- The tobacco industry is required to submit detailed reports to the Member States with the ingredients used in tobacco products.
- Tobacco packaging warning messages have to be accurately stated on 65% of the product packaging. This involves the front and back of cigarette and roll-your-own tobacco packages and small containers for certain tobacco products.
- The directive bans all promotional or misleading sectors on tobacco products.
- Introducing EU-wide tracking and tracing to prevent illegal trade of tobacco products; allowing Member States to prohibit internet sales of tobacco related products.
- Setting out the safety and quality requirements for a consumer of electronic cigarettes.
- Creation of smoke-free environments.
- Tobacco taxation.

=== Requirements ===
The directive restrict the capacity of electronic cigarettes refill tanks to no more than 2 ml and a maximum volume of e-liquids containing nicotine for sale for one refill container to 10 ml. The nicotine strength of e-liquids to no more than 20 mg/ml and require products containing nicotine and their packaging to be tamper proof and resistant to child tampering.

The new regulation prohibited the use of certain ingredients that included taurine, colourings and caffeine, the mandatory use of new labelling and health warning signs on the packaging.

=== United Kingdom ===
The new regulations require that the sale of all e-liquids and e-cigarettes should be done after notifying the Medicines and Healthcare Products Regulatory Agency (MHRA) for the case of the United Kingdom (UK). The TPD was implemented in the UK through the Tobacco and Related Products Regulations 2016 act that also defined producers of e-cigarettes. The definition described e-cigarette producers as any entity that manufactures, imports, or re-brands any tobacco related products for resale. In accordance with the new regulations, producers are required to provide the relevant authorities with all pertinent information regarding their products to the MHRA.

== Enforcement and cooperation ==
The new directive was cognizant of the fact that its success was pegged on the co-operation of all member states that were party to its implementation in their various jurisdictions and pertinent to their internal provisions and laws. All member states were required to ensure that all producers and importers of tobacco and their related products to provide correct information to the pertinent authorities within the provided timelines. The obligation to provide such information was placed primarily on manufacturers and importers of all tobacco and their related products to the relevant authorities. Member states were required to ensure that tobacco and their related products complied with the new directives, failure to which the relevant authorities are empowered to take the appropriate course of action to prevent their entry into the market. The new directive made it the responsibility of member states to formulate and enforce appropriate penalties for the infringement of national and EU provisions and their enforcement. The administration of financial penalties was to be imposed for intentional infringement aimed at accruing financial advantage to the involved entity. The directive required that all member states co-operate with each other to promote the correct application and enforcement of all provisions of the directive in a manner characterised by the sharing of information necessary for its uniform implementation.

== Industry response ==
The initial response to the directive by e-liquid manufacturers was to invest heavily in the testing of their range of products in order to achieve directive compliance. This proved costly due to:

1. The demand for testing increased significantly in the lead up to the implementation date, leading to cost inflation for basic e-liquid compliance testing as the supply of laboratories was limited and was not pre-emptive to the electronic cigarette market.
2. The directive required each variation of the relevant nicotine containing e-liquid to also undergo compliance testing. For example, where the relevant e-liquid was to be available in 20 mg and 10 mg, two compliance tests would need to be conducted for each particular nicotine strength. If there were also non-nicotine variations, such as in the vegetable glycerol and propylene glycol ratio, further tests would have to be conducted for each additional ratio at each corresponding nicotine strength.

In 2014, Ernst & Young reported that over 73% of the consumer market used e-liquid at 1–11 mg nicotine strength. With this vast consumer trend towards lower strength nicotine e-liquids, and as the directive only concerns itself with nicotine containing e-liquids as opposed to flavourings and other ingredients, it became clear that dilution of a small quantity of highly concentrated nicotine that would only have to be tested once at the maximum nicotine strength was a viable and more cost-effective route to directive compliance.

In essence, dilution involved the creation of a flavourless nicotine-containing e-liquid at a maximum or close to maximum nicotine strength, such as 20 mg, in the maximum capacity bottle size of 10ml to be mixed with a larger bottle of flavoured 0 mg e-liquid in order to create an overall e-liquid concentration that was aligned with the most used nicotine strength. For example, upon mixing 10 ml of 18 mg nicotine with a 50 ml bottle containing the relevant flavourings, a user can achieve 60 ml of e-liquid with an overall nicotine strength of 3 mg.

These small 10 ml nicotine bottles containing highly concentrated nicotine have become known as ‘nicotine shots’, and the market has adapted to now recognise this method as the norm.

== See also ==
- Cigarette filter ban
- E-cigarette deposit-system
- List of tobacco products
- Plain tobacco packaging
- WHO Framework Convention on Tobacco Control
