= Slí na Sláinte =

Health promotion initiative

Slí na Sláinte signpost in Galway

Slí na Sláinte (Irish pronunciation: [ˌʃl̠ʲiː n̪ˠə ˈsˠl̪ˠaːn̠ʲtʲə]; meaning "path of health") is an initiative developed by the Irish Heart Foundation. The initiative, which began in the mid-1990s in Ireland, is also in operation in a number of other countries. It is intended to encourage exercise and to increase the number of people walking. According to the Irish Heart Foundation, walking is a "perfect form of exercise", is free and "can be done anywhere, anytime and requires no special gear".

== Operation ==
Under the initiative, yellow signs on blue poles are placed at one-kilometre intervals along established walking routes. These signs, which are funded by the relevant local authority, allow walkers to keep track of how far they have walked.

In some locations, trained walking leaders promote and lead walks in their area, and run the "Slí Challenge" to help people calculate their time and distance walked to help them achieve awards when targets are met.

As of 2007, there were over 150 Slí na Sláinte walking routes around Ireland. By 2021, this had grown to a network of 230 routes in Ireland. The programme was also introduced in other European countries, including in Sweden and Germany.

== Gallery ==
Slí na Sláinte signpost

Slí na Sláinte route map in Glengarriff

Slí na Sláinte track marker

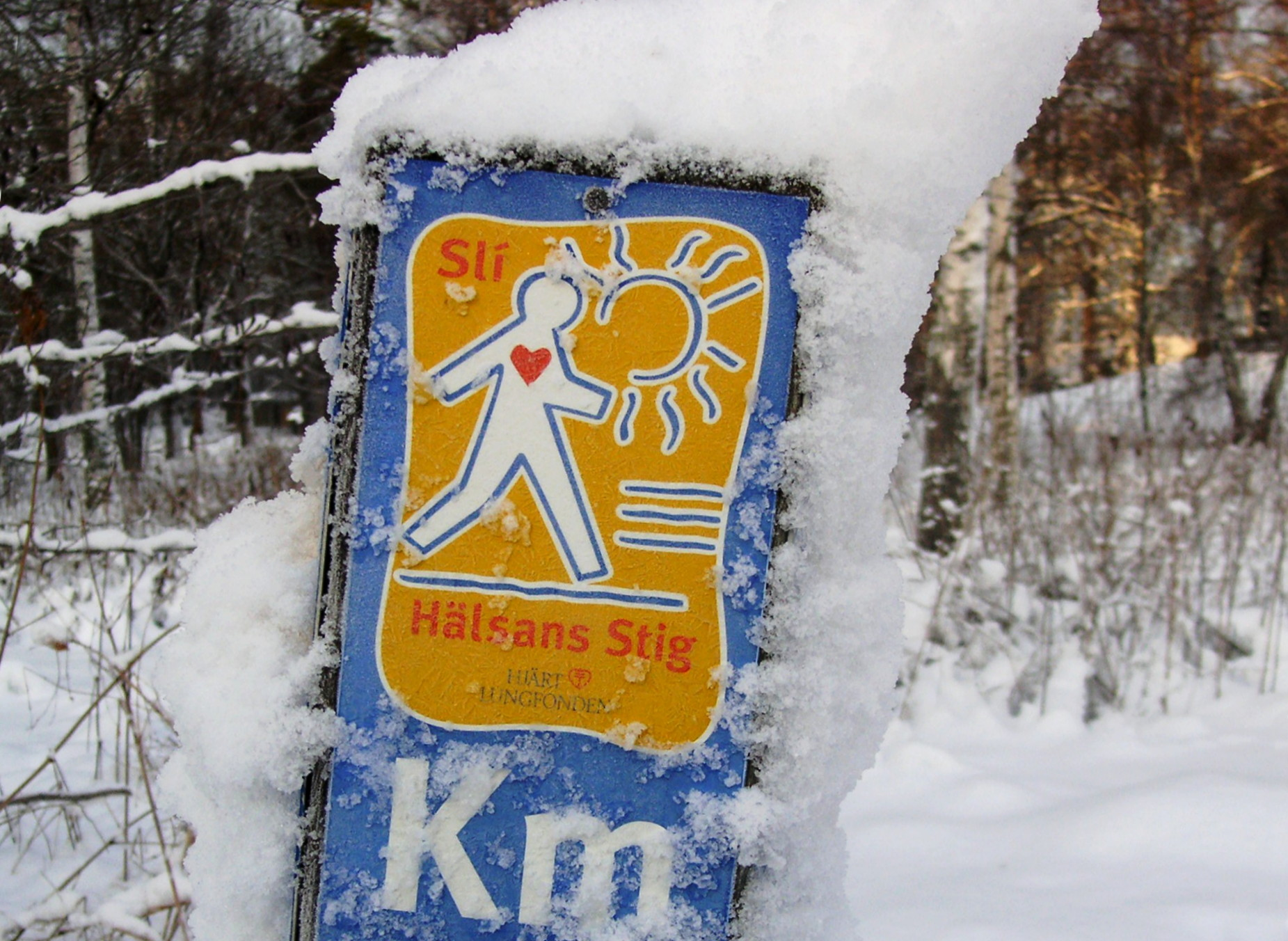
Slí na Sláinte "Hälsans stig" in Sweden

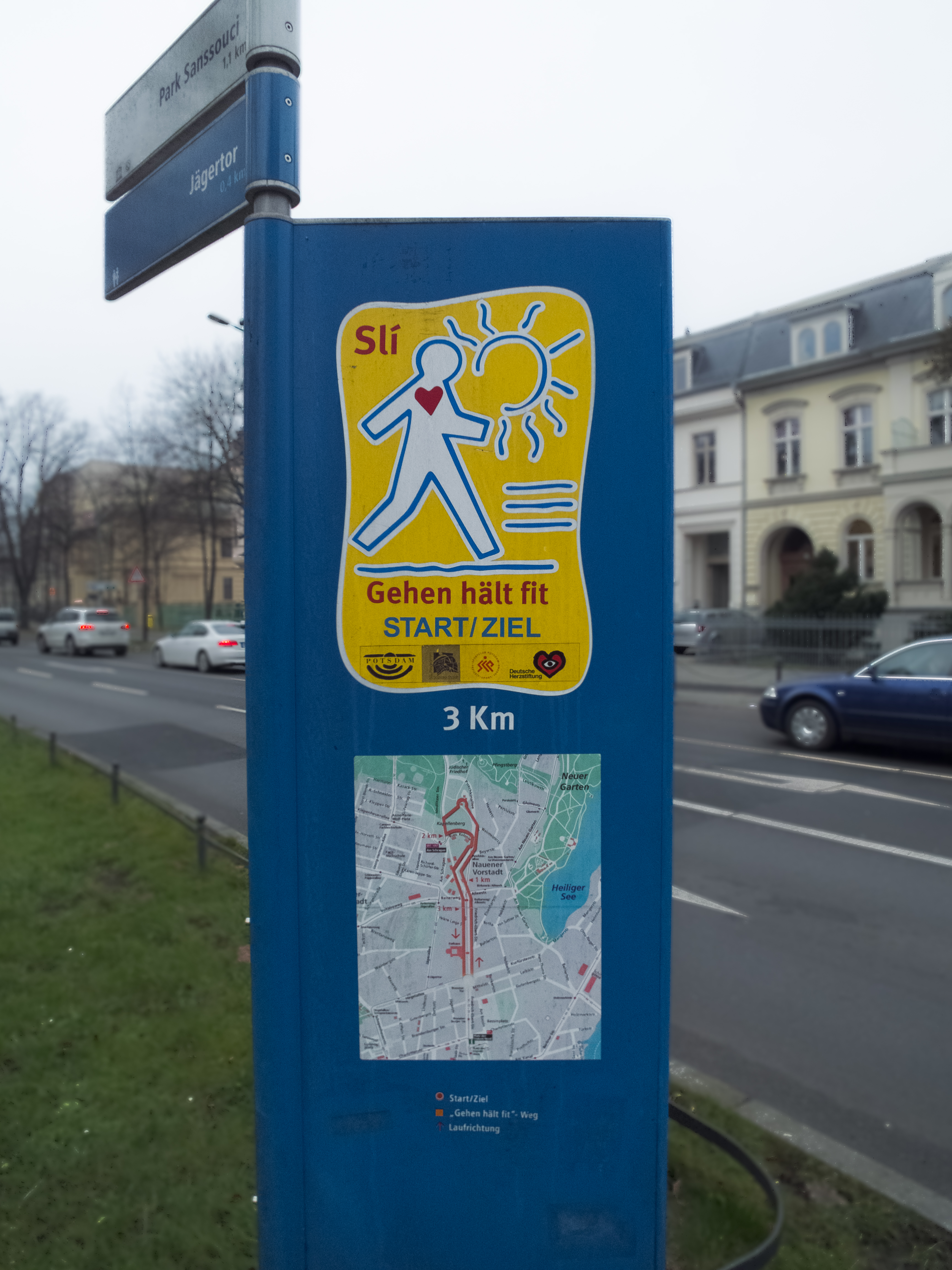
Slí na Sláinte sign in Potsdam, Brandenburg.
