= Mooncoyne =

- Origin: Tacoma, Washington, USA
- Genres: Celtic, Celtic Traditional
- Years active: 1995-present
- Labels: Mooncoyne
- Members: Roderick Campbell; Kent Hooper; Bob McCafferty-Lent; Martin Nyberg; Brynn Starr; Greg Youtz; Katie Youtz
- Past members: Anthea Lawrence; Jean Huskamp; Lawson Dumbeck; Jeff Bremer

Mooncoyne is a Celtic band from Tacoma, Washington. Their music ranges from traditional Irish jigs and reels to contemporary Celtic ballads.

== History ==
Mooncoyne is a traditional Irish folk band from Tacoma, WA. They began performing in the summer of 1995 under the name Puget Sounds which stemmed from their formation at a bluegrass and Irish jam session at the University of Puget Sound. Later, the band changed its name to Sláinte, which is Gaelic for "cheers" or "good health". Their aim was to create enjoyable, danceable, and spirited music for people of all ages. That multi-generational band had players whose ages spanned 35 years and was an early internet music success. After Sláinte dissolved, three core members (Starr, McCaffery-Lent, and Hooper) appeared as bobryken celtic until 2007 when that band morphed into Mooncoyne, adding Greg Youtz, Katie Youtz, Roderick Campbell and Martin Nyberg. Mooncoyne released the album Rolling Glory in March, 2011. After Sláinte dissolved, two other core members (Lawrence and Dumbeck) began appearing as Fiddlehead and another core member (Bremer) played with The Burren Boys. The other core member of Sláinte, Huskamp, has continued to play in a number of bands.

== Band members ==
- Roderick Campbell: bodhrán, djembe, cajón, various percussion
- Kent Hooper: whistle, accordion
- Bob McCafferty-Lent: guitar, cittern, mandolin, vocals
- Martin Nyberg: guitar, vocals
- Brynn Starr: fiddle, vocals
- Greg Youtz: whistle, harmonica, percussion, vocals
- Katie Youtz: fiddle, vocals

== Discography (Sláinte) ==
- Sláinte (June, 1997)
- Cup of Tea (December, 1999)
- Sláinte: The Songs (September 20, 2000)
- Sláinte: The Tunes (June 19, 2001)
- The Best of Sláinte (August 19, 2002)

== Discography (bobryken celtic) ==
- bobryken celtic: Good People All (December, 2002)
- bobryken celtic: The Wind that Shakes the Barley (March, 2004)

== Discography (Mooncoyne) ==
- Rolling Thunder (March 2011)
