= Cup of Tea (album) =

Studio album by Mooncoyne (aka Sláinte)
- Released: January 2000
- Genre: Irish Traditional

Mooncoyne (aka Sláinte) chronology
Cup of Tea (2000)	The Songs (2000)

Cup of Tea is an album by Irish traditional Celtic band Sláinte, which renamed itself Mooncoyne in 2007. Released in 2000, Cup of Tea is a mixture of tunes and songs from Mooncoyne's repertoire.

== Track listing ==
1. "The Banshee - Gravel Walks - The Old Copperplate" (Traditional) – 3:50
2. "Mairi's Wedding" (Traditional) – 2:13
3. "The Butterfly - Kid on the Mountain" (Traditional) – 4:07
4. "Fear A Bhata" (Traditional) – 5:10
5. "Britches Full of Stitches - Munster Bank - Bill Sullivan's (The A Polkas)" (Traditional) – 4:13
6. "The Manx Lullaby" (Traditional) – 3:32
7. "Scully's Reel - Mrs McLeod's - Cooley's Reel" (Traditional) – 3:37
8. "Lakes Of Pontchartrain" (Traditional) – 5:45
9. "Lark in the Morning - The Atholl Highlanders" (Traditional) – 4:10
10. "She Moved Through The Fair" (Traditional) – 5:30
11. "The Crosses of Annagh - The Humors of Tulla - The Cup of Tea" (Traditional) – 3:47
12. "Denis Murphy's Polka - I'll Tell Me Ma - John Ryan's Polka" (Traditional) – 3:43
13. "Fanny Power" (Traditional) – 5:29
14. "Jig of Slurs - Dublin Reel - Merry Blacksmith - The Mountain Road" (Traditional) – 5:13

== Personnel ==
- Jeff Bremer (concertina/bass)
- Lawson Dumbeck (guitar)
- Kent Hooper (whistles)
- Jean Huskamp (mandolin)
- Anthea Lawrence (lead vocals/fiddle)
- Bob McCaffery-Lent (guitars/cittern/vocals)
- Brynn Starr (fiddle/vocals)
