= Irish Heart Foundation =

Nonprofit organization in Dublin, Ireland

- Abbreviation: IHF
- Formation: 1966
- Type: Charity
- Headquarters: Dublin, Ireland
- Affiliations: ASH Ireland

The Irish Heart Foundation (IHF) is a charity founded in 1966 based in Dublin that support groups for patients who have had heart problems or strokes and campaigns on public health issues which affect the risk of heart disease and stroke. In 1992, the IHF and the Irish Cancer Society co-founded ASH Ireland to promote smoking cessation.

It has a Mobile Health Unit which offers free blood pressure checks, heart health information and lifestyle advice. It carries out about 10,000 blood pressure checks a year.

It runs campaigns to increase awareness of atrial fibrillation and a "Chairs Can Kill" campaign to raise awareness of the risks to heart health of sitting for long periods of time.

It urges the government to adopt policies which will improve health, such as banning advertising of junk food to children and attacks unhealthy food adverts in its ‘Stop Targeting Kids’ campaign. It also attacked Salt Vape Ireland for handing out free vapes in Dublin pubs and nightclubs in exchange for social media exposure.

== See also ==
- Slí na Sláinte
