= Tobacco display ban =

Law prohibiting retailers from displaying tobacco

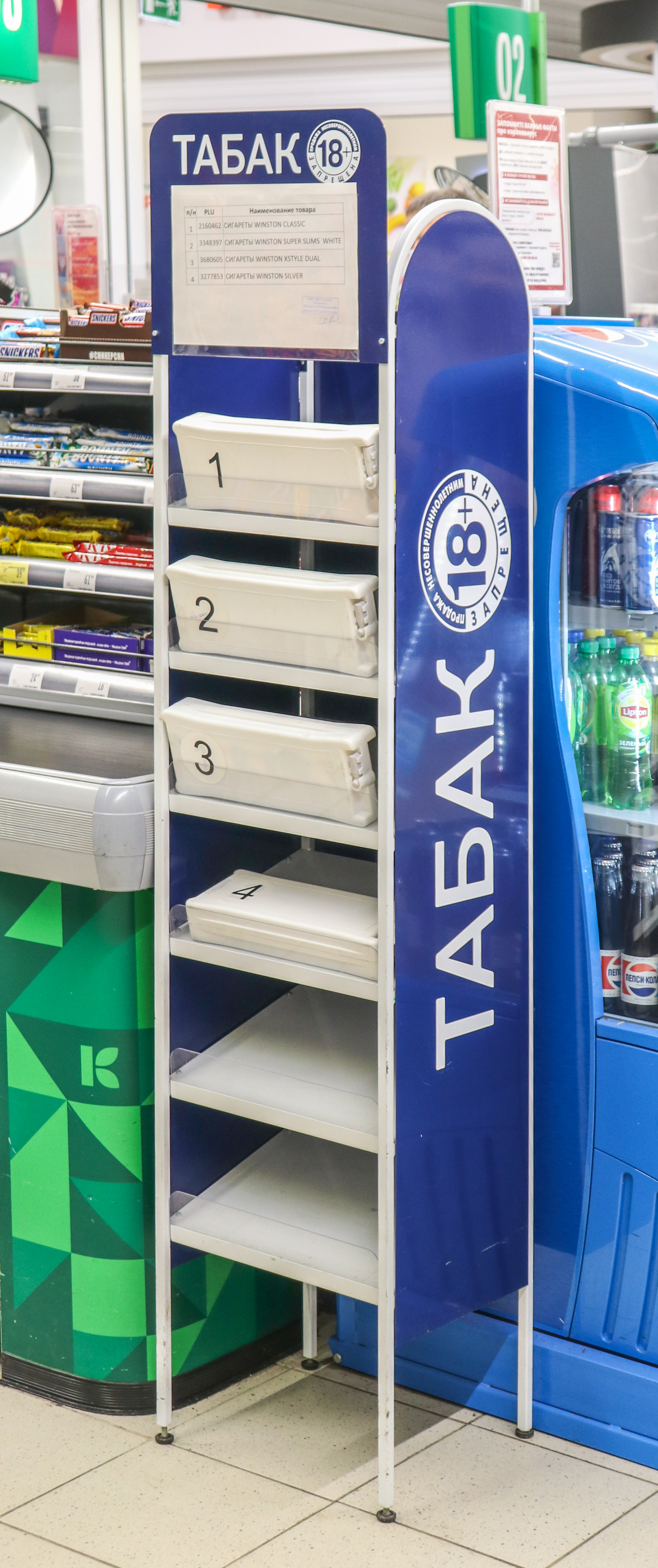
Russia prohibits retailers from openly displaying tobacco products. At this supermarket in Moscow, cigarettes are kept hidden from plain sight in boxes. The number on each box corresponds to a cigarette brand shown on the sign above the shelves.

A tobacco display ban, point-of-sale display ban or retail display ban is a measure imposed in some jurisdictions prohibiting retailers from displaying tobacco products.

Tobacco display bans are in place in several countries and regions. The implementation differs, but the ban in most jurisdictions mandates that shops and stores that sell tobacco products keep the products out of sight of customers, under the counter, or in special cabinets. Tobacco products can only be shown on request from customers. The idea behind the regulation is that people would be less inclined to smoke if they cannot see the products.

== Effects ==
The World Health Organization(WHO)/Europe reported that display bans reduce smokers’ reported exposure to tobacco advertising and curb impulse purchases, supporting their use as part of comprehensive Tobacco Advertising, Promotion and Sponsorship (TAPS) measures.

Opponents of tobacco display bans claim that the regulations have caused shops to close as a result of costs associated with the ban, and that the bans have caused the proportion of illegal or 'contraband' cigarettes sold to increase. Following the 2007 ban in Canada, in the span of 2–3 years a reduction of 5% of illegal cigarettes was observed: 20.7 per cent of cigarettes sold in 2010 were illegal (down from 25.1% in 2008), and 15 per cent of convenience stores have closed. In Iceland 30 per cent of smaller shops have closed. It is not yet clear whether the shop closures were linked to the tobacco display ban or the significant wider economic issues affecting Iceland during the period in question.

Proponents of tobacco display bans argue that some of the stores have closed for other reasons, such as the prevailing economic conditions or a downward trend in smoking levels. Proponents point to the lack of evidence to prove significant negative unintended consequences. They note that the few studies that have been undertaken at best show a correlation between certain trends, but stress that does not prove causation between the ban and alleged increases in shop closures, nor smoking levels.

In the August 2010 issue of Pediatrics it is argued that young people who visit tobacco stores frequently smoke more often than their peers.

== Jurisdictions with tobacco display bans ==
Country or region	Notes and date of implementation
Australia	Retail display ban now in all states and territories with the exception of specialist tobacconists
Belgium	Display of tobacco products banned from 1 April 2025. Fines are up to 800,000 euro. Shops bigger than 400 meter squared who mostly sell food are not allowed to sell any tobacco products.
Canada	Display ban now in place for all provinces and territories with Saskatchewan being the first in 2005. The most recent legislation coming into force in Labrador and Newfoundland on 1 January 2010. Ontario banned the display of tobacco products from 31 May 2008 and Alberta and British Columbia in the summer of 2008.
Croatia	Display of tobacco products banned from 1 July 2014
Finland	Display of tobacco products banned from 1 January 2012
Iceland	First country in the world to implement a shop display ban for tobacco in 2001
Ireland	First country in the EU to implement a display ban which came into effect on 1 July 2009
Kosovo	A full retail display ban came into force on 24 June 2013
Macau (China)	1 January 2018
New Zealand	Tobacco display ban came into force on 23 July 2012
Netherlands	Tobacco display ban came into force on 1 July 2020 for supermarkets and on 1 January 2021 for other places of sale. There is an exception for specialist tobacco sellers.
Norway	Since 1 January 2010 the display of tobacco products has been prohibited
Russia	Display of tobacco products banned from 1 July 2014
Singapore	1 August 2017
Thailand	Display ban came into effect in 2005
United Kingdom	England – Retail shops (>280 sq m)- 6 April 2012. Smaller shops (<280 sq m) - 6 April 2015 In England, the phased implementation concluded on 6 April 2015 when the retail display ban was extended from large shops to all other businesses selling tobacco. Northern Ireland – Retail shops (>280 sq m) – 31 October 2012. Smaller shops (<280 sq m) - 6 April 2015; Wales – Retail shops (>280 sq m) – 3 December 2012. Smaller shops (<280 sq m) - 6 April 2015; Scotland – Retail shops (>280 sq m) – 29 April 2013. Smaller shops (<280 sq m) - 6 April 2015

== See also ==
- Tobacco-free pharmacies – a similar more worldwide movement
- Plain tobacco packaging
