= Pantone 448 C =

Colour in the Pantone colour system

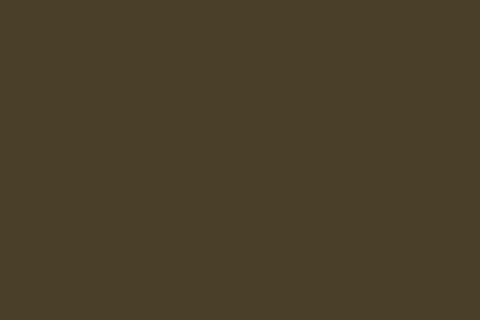

Colour coordinates
- Hex triplet: #4A412A
- sRGB^{B} (r, g, b): (74, 65, 42)
- HSV (h, s, v): (43°, 43%, 29%)
- CIELCh_{uv} (L, C, h): (28, 17, 67°)
- Source: Pantone
- ISCC–NBS descriptor: Dark grayish olive
- B: Normalized to [0–255] (byte)

Pantone 448 C is a colour in the Pantone colour system. Described as "drab dark brown," it has been informally dubbed the "ugliest colour in the world". It was selected in 2012 as the colour for plain tobacco and cigarette packaging in Australia, after market researchers determined that it was the least attractive colour.

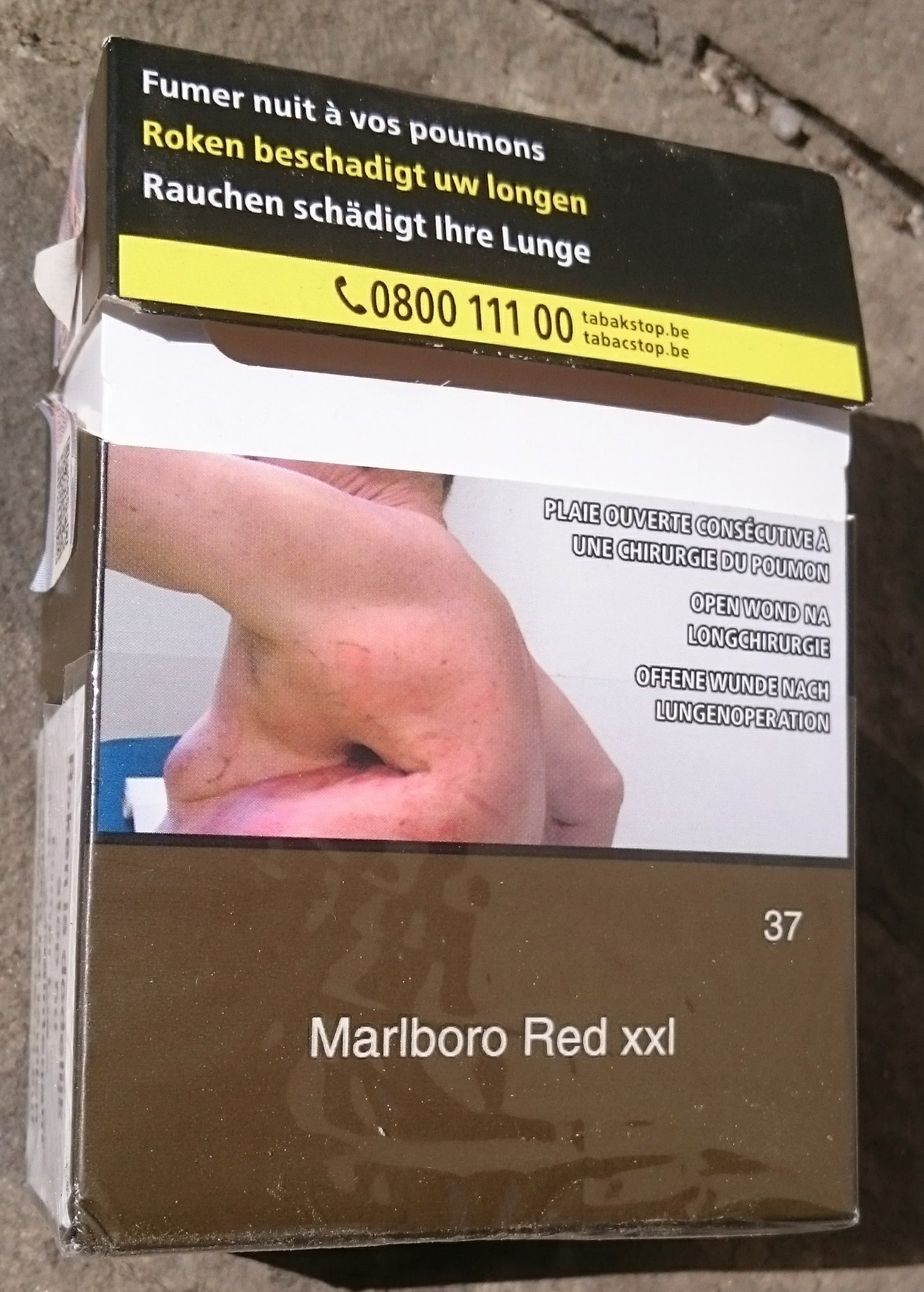
As used on a plain cigarette packet from Belgium

The Australian Department of Health initially referred to the colour as "olive green", but the name was changed after concerns were expressed by the Australian Olive Association.

Since 2016, the colour has been used for plain cigarette packaging in other countries, including Belgium, Canada, France, Finland, Ireland, Israel, the Netherlands, Norway, New Zealand, Slovenia, Saudi Arabia, Singapore, Thailand, Turkey, the United Kingdom and Uruguay.

The colour has been widely but erroneously called "opaque couché"; the French for "layered opaque". The confusion may have arisen because "Pantone opaque couché" is the French name of a swatch library (palette) in Adobe Illustrator containing this colour, intended for printing in solid ink colours on coated paper. In English, this library is named "Pantone solid coated".
