= Counterfeit illegal drug selling =

Selling counterfeit illegal drugs is a crime in many U.S. states' legal codes and in the federal law of the United States. The fake drugs are sometimes termed as imitation controlled substances.

== Relation to drug-related crimes ==
There is a low chance of law punishing fraud among illicit drug traders, however it is likely that informal social control among drug traders reduces the likelihood of fraud between illegal trade partners. For instance, getting robbed or losing a business contact may not justify dealer's increased profits for a short-term from fraudulent behavior.

== Legal status ==
Selling counterfeit illicit drugs is illegal even if the substances used to make the imitation drug are not illegal on themselves. It is illegal to distribute or sell counterfeit fake drugs in many U.S. states including Nevada, Ohio, Illinois, Florida, Michigan and Massachusetts.

=== U.S. Federal Law ===
Selling counterfeit illicit drugs is illegal under the U.S. federal law. Relevant parts of the U.S. federal law include 21 U.S.C. § 331 and 18 U.S.C. § 1001.

21 U.S.C. § 331 makes it illegal to sell an adulterated or misbranded drug in interstate commerce.

18 U.S.C. § 1001 bans

- falsifying, concealing or covering up a material fact;
- making any materially false, fictitious or fraudulent statement or representation; or
- making or using any false writing or document knowing that it contains materially false, fictitious or fraudulent statements.

== Deaths ==
=== Europe ===
==== Amsterdam ====
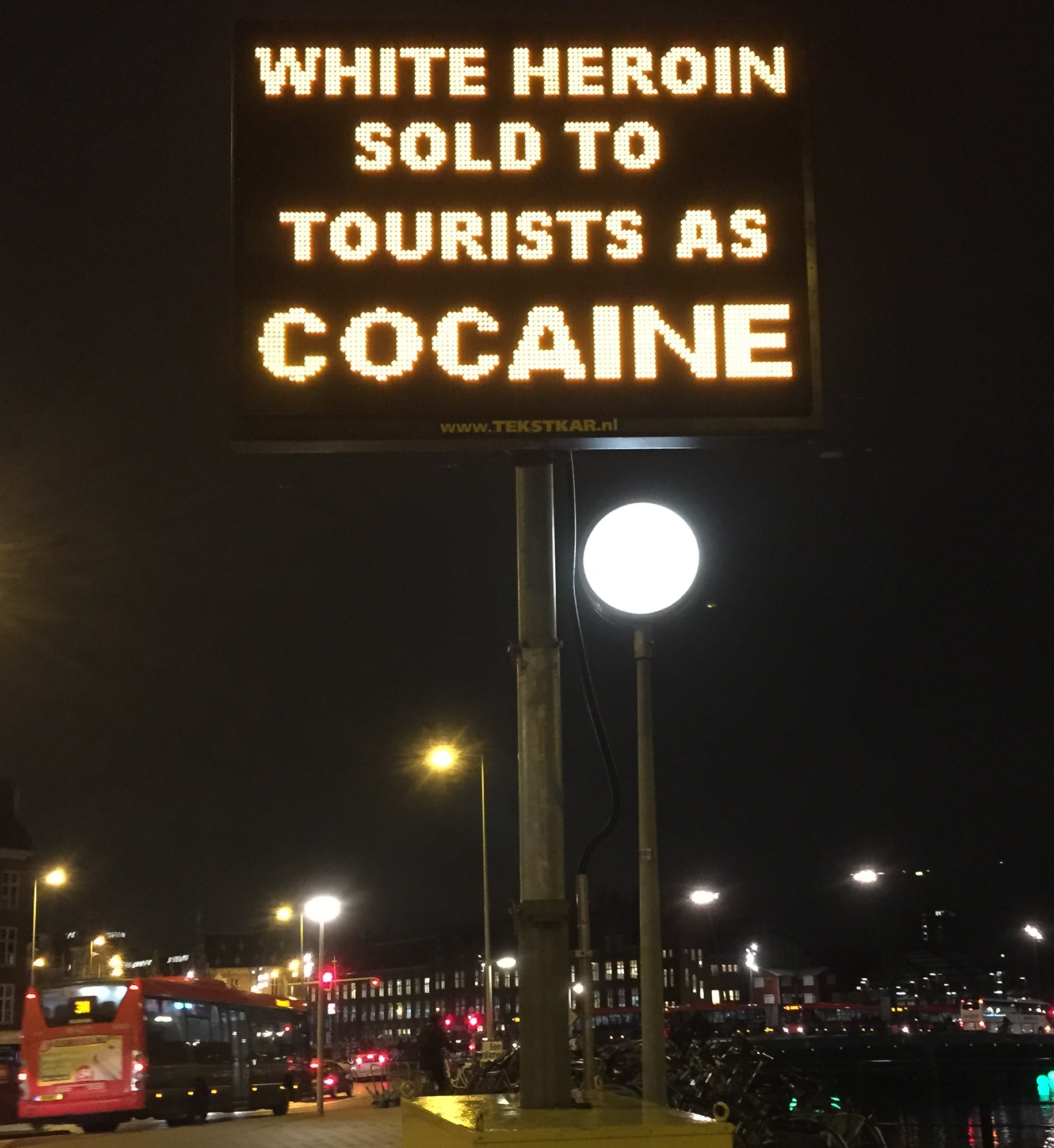
Warning sign in Amsterdam after 3 tourists died after taking white heroin that was sold as cocaine

On 25 November 2014 two British tourists aged 20 and 21 died in a hotel room in Amsterdam, after snorting white heroin that was sold as cocaine by a street dealer. The bodies were found less than a month after another British tourist died in similar circumstances. At least 17 other people have had medical treatment after taking the white heroin.

==== Sweden ====
Nine deaths occurred in Sweden during 2010–11 relating to use of Krypton, a mixture of kratom, caffeine and O-desmethyltramadol, a metabolite of the opioid analgesic tramadol.

== See also ==
- Unclean hands
