= Route 36 (disambiguation) =

Route 36 may refer to:

- Route 36 (MTA Maryland), a public bus route in Baltimore, Maryland
- London Buses route 36
- SEPTA Route 36, a Philadelphia Subway-Surface Trolley line.
- Route 36 (WMATA), a public bus route in Washington, D.C.
- Harrogate bus route 36, a bus route in Yorkshire, England
- Route 36 (bar), a cocaine bar in La Paz, Bolivia

== See also ==
- List of highways numbered 36
