= Drug policy of the Netherlands =

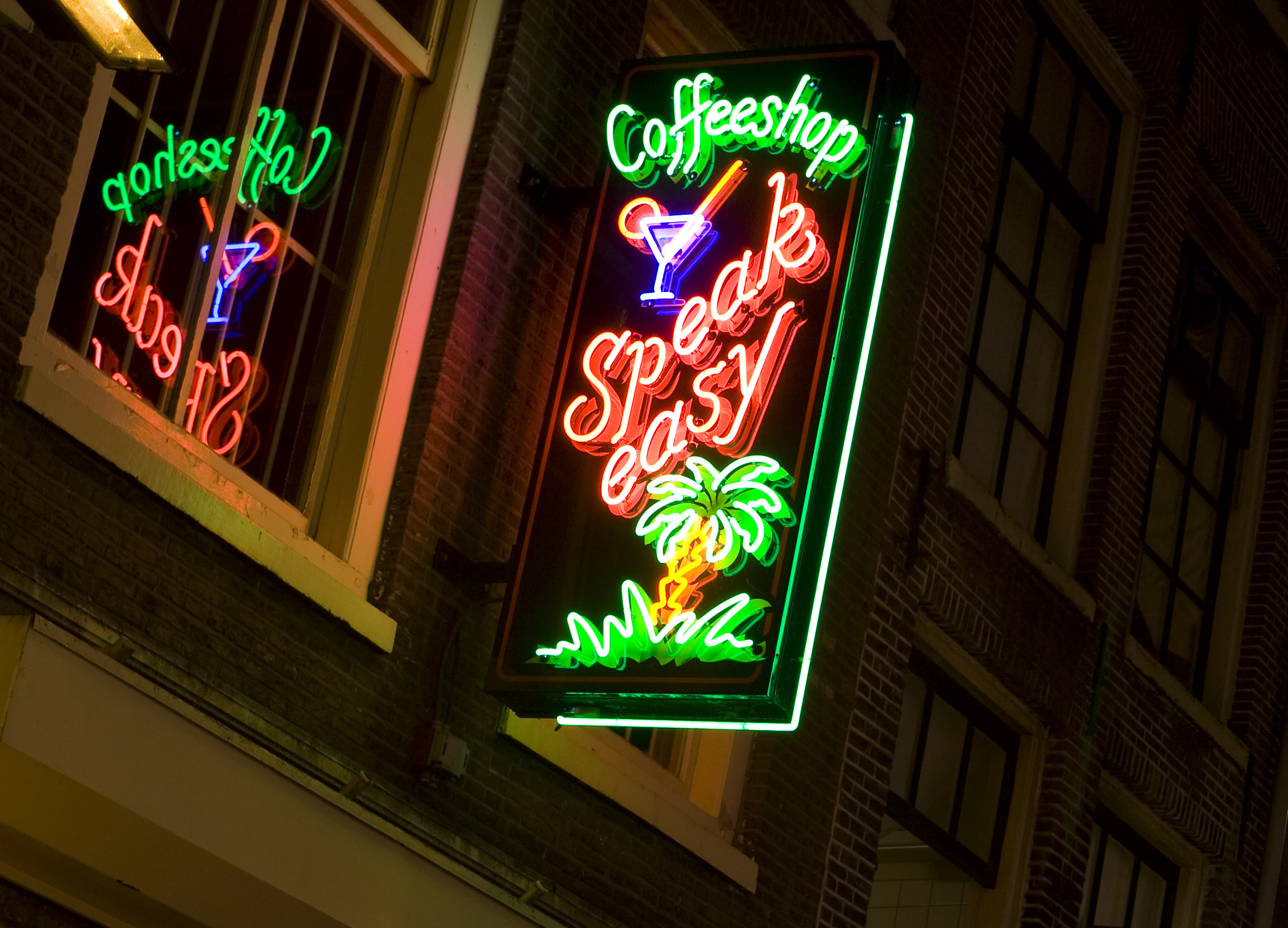
Cannabis coffee shop in Amsterdam, Netherlands

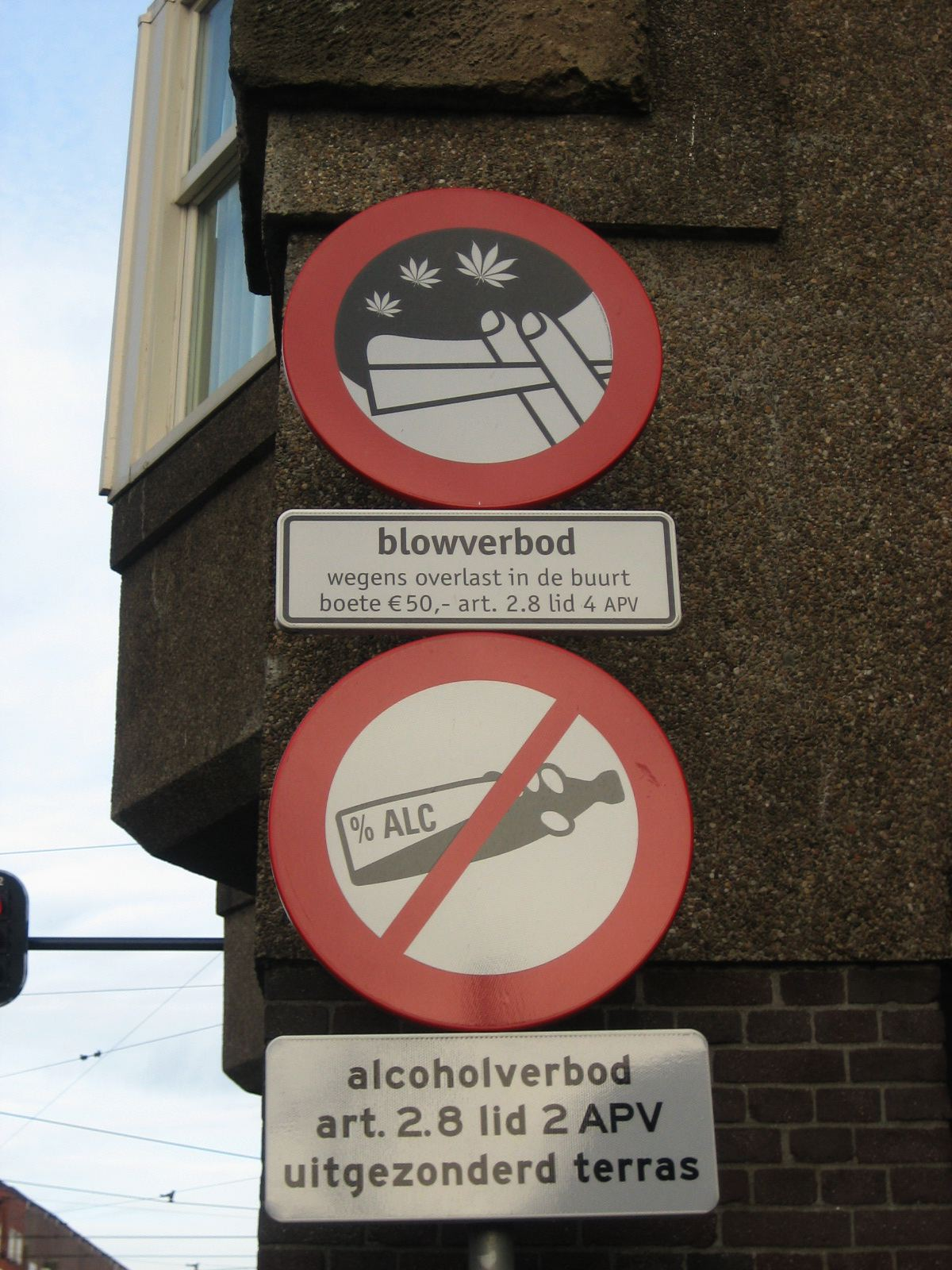
Signs in Amsterdam, indicating smoking cannabis and drinking alcohol are prohibited in this particular neighbourhood due to disturbances

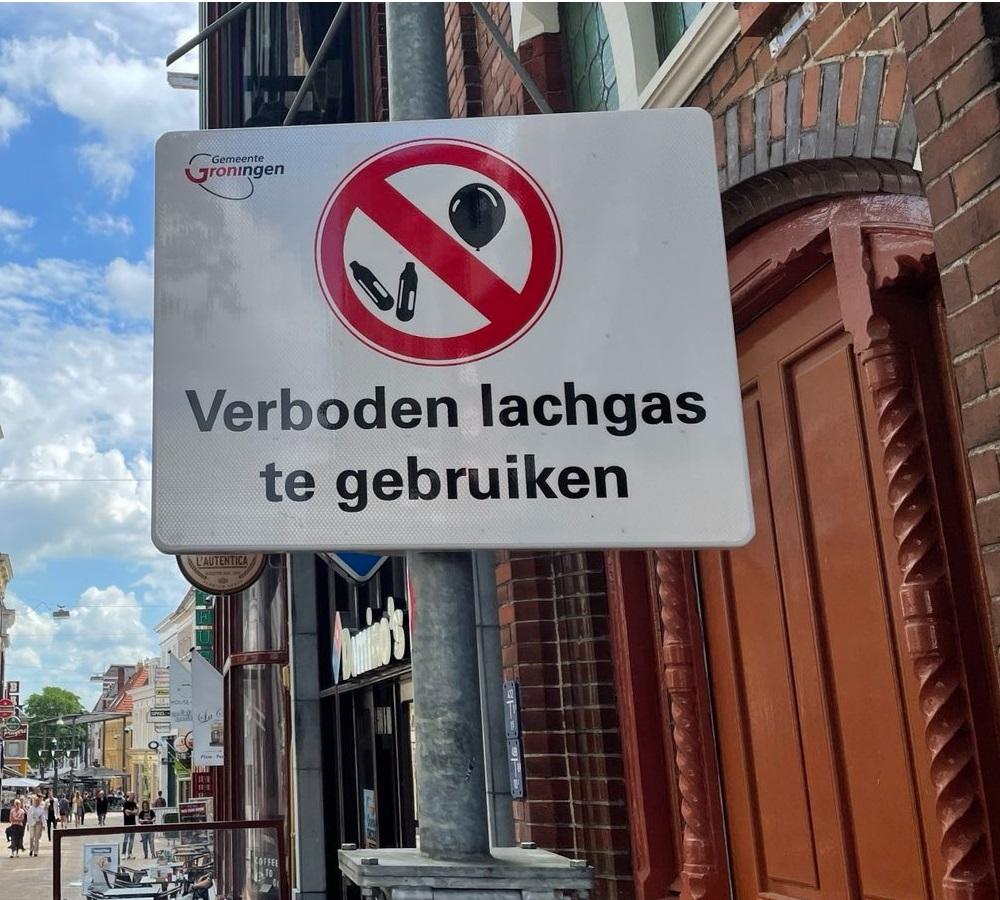
Street sign indicating ban of nitrous oxide use in Groningen

While recreational use, possession and trade of non-medicinal drugs described by the Opium Law are all technically illegal under Dutch law, official policy since the late 20th century has been to openly tolerate all recreational use by adults (18+), while tolerating possession and trade under certain circumstances. This pragmatic approach was motivated by the idea that a drug-free Dutch society is unrealistic and unattainable, and efforts would be better spent trying to minimize harm caused by recreational drug use. As a result of this gedoogbeleid (lit. "tolerance policy" or "policy of tolerance"), the Netherlands is typically seen as much more tolerant of drugs than most other countries.

Legal distinctions are made in the Opium Law between drugs with a low risk of harm and/or addiction, called 'soft drugs', and drugs with a high risk of harm and/or addiction, called 'hard drugs'. Soft drugs include hash, marijuana, sleeping pills and sedatives, while hard drugs include heroin, cocaine, amphetamine, LSD and ecstasy. Policy has been to largely tolerate the sale of soft drugs while strongly suppressing the sale, circulation and use of hard drugs, effectively separating it into two markets. Establishments that have been permitted to sell soft drugs under certain circumstances (such as restricting entry and sale to those aged 18 and over) are called coffee shops. Laws established in January 2013 required visitors of coffee shops to be Dutch residents, but these laws were only applied in Zeeland, North Brabant and Limburg after much local criticism. Possession of a soft drug for personal use in quantities below a certain threshold (5 grams of cannabis or 5 cannabis plants) is tolerated, but larger quantities or possession of hard drugs may lead to prosecution. Prosecution for possession, trade and (in some rare cases) use are typically handled by the municipal government except where large-scale criminal activity is suspected.

Notably absent from toleration of drugs is its production, particularly the cultivation of cannabis. This has led to a seemingly paradoxical system where coffee shops are allowed to buy and sell soft drugs but where production is nearly always punished. Because coffee shops have to get their goods from somewhere, criticism has been raised over the years against continued prosecution of soft drug producers. It was first challenged in court in 2014 when a judge found two people guilty of producing cannabis in large quantities but refused to punish them. A significant change occurred in early 2017, when a slight majority in the House of Representatives allowed for a law to pass that would partly legalize production of cannabis. In late 2017, the newly formed coalition announced that they would seek to implement an experimental pilot program in smaller cities where coffee shops could acquire cannabis from a state-appointed producer. The program went into effect in two cities - Breda and Tilburg - in December 2023.

While the legalization of cannabis remains controversial, the introduction of heroin-assisted treatment in 1998 has been lauded for considerably improving the health and social situation of opiate-dependent patients in the Netherlands.

== Public health ==
Cigarette smokers as a percentage of the population for the Netherlands as compared with the United States, Norway, Japan, and Finland

Large-scale dealing, production, import and export are prosecuted to the fullest extent of the law, even if it does not supply end users or coffeeshops with more than the allowed amounts. Exactly how coffeeshops get their supplies is rarely investigated, however. The average concentration of THC in the cannabis sold in coffeeshops has increased from 9% in 1998 to 18% in 2005. This means that less plant material has to be consumed to achieve the same effect. One of the reasons is plant breeding and use of greenhouse technology for illegal growing of cannabis in Netherlands. The former minister of Justice Piet Hein Donner announced in June 2007 that cultivation of cannabis shall continue to be illegal.

== Non-enforcement ==
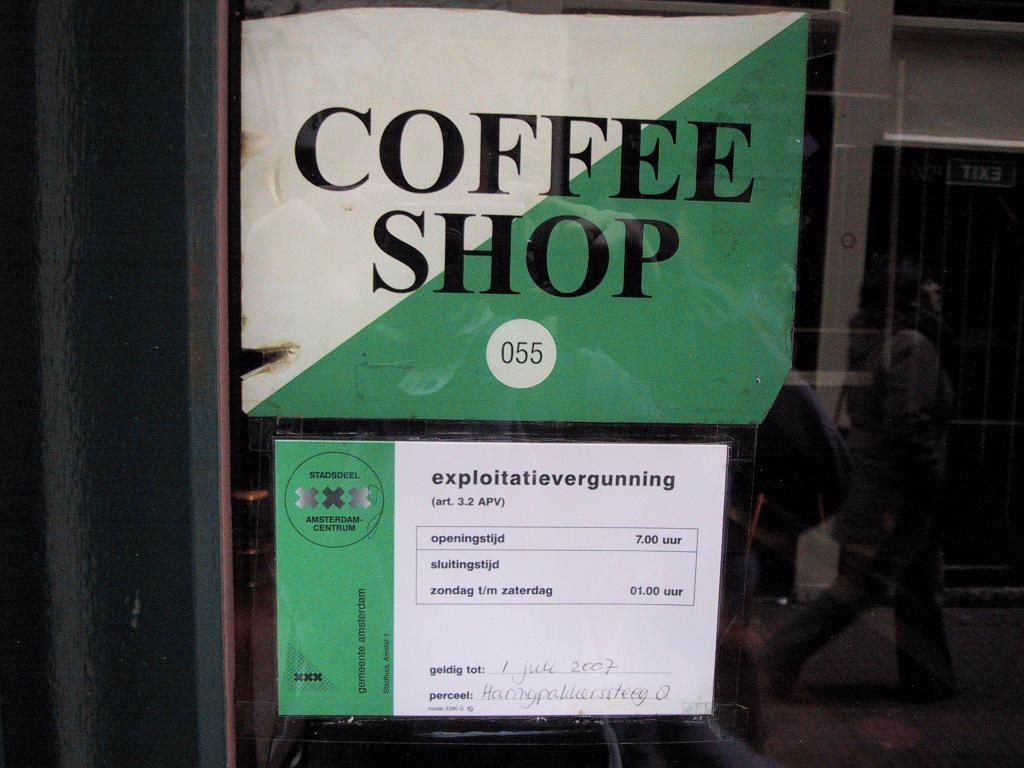
City license for a cannabis coffee shop in Amsterdam, Netherlands

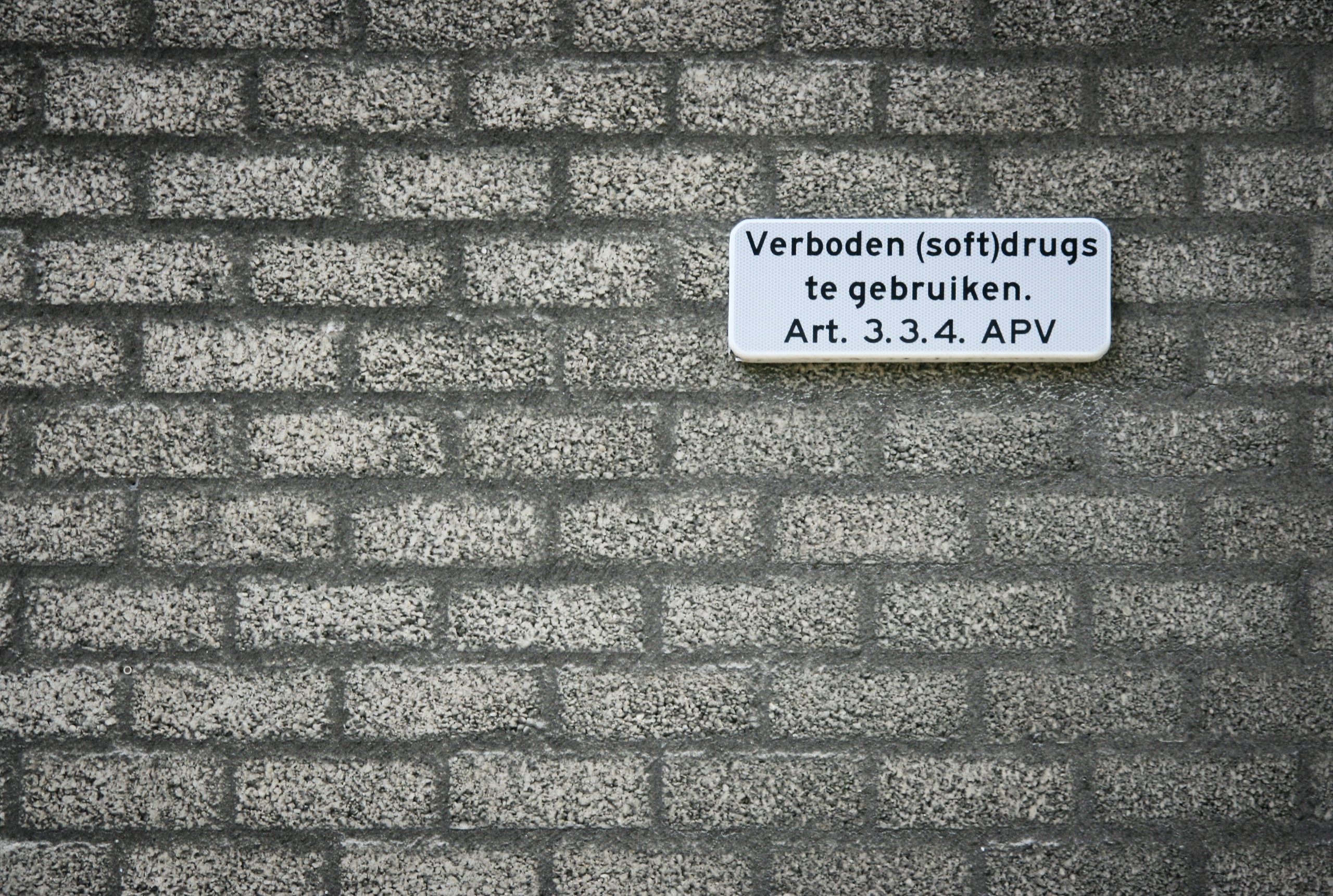
Drug use is forbidden by local ordinance in Rotterdam.

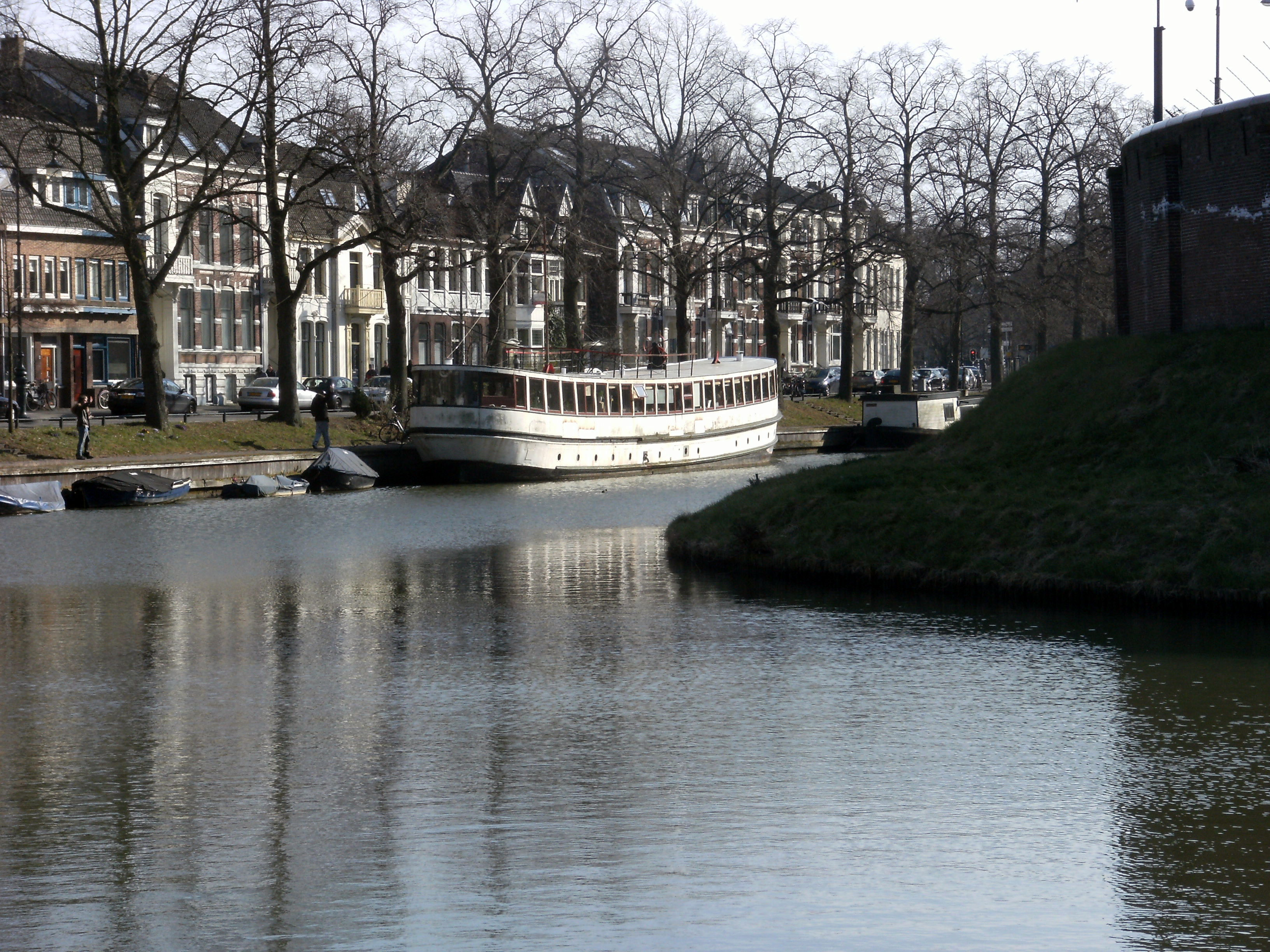
A coffeeshop in Utrecht

The drug policy of the Netherlands is marked by its distinguishing between so called soft and hard drugs. An often used argument is that alcohol, which is claimed by some scientists as a hard drug, is legal and a soft drug cannot be more dangerous to society if it is controlled. This may refer to the Prohibition in the 1920s, when the U.S. government decided to ban all alcohol. Prohibition created a golden opportunity for organized crime syndicates to smuggle alcohol, and as a result the syndicates were able to gain considerable power in some major cities. Cannabis remains a controlled substance in the Netherlands and both possession and production for personal use are still misdemeanors, punishable by fines. Coffeeshops are also technically illegal but are flourishing nonetheless. However, a policy of non-enforcement has led to a situation where reliance upon non-enforcement has become common, and because of this the courts have ruled against the government when individual cases were prosecuted.

This is because the Dutch Ministry of Justice applies a gedoogbeleid (tolerance policy) with regard to the category of soft drugs: an official set of guidelines telling public prosecutors under which circumstances offenders should not be prosecuted. This is a more official version of a common practice in other European countries wherein law enforcement sets priorities regarding offenses on which it is important enough to spend limited resources.

According to current gedoogbeleid the possession of a maximum amount of five grams cannabis for personal use is not prosecuted. Cultivation is treated in a similar way. Cultivation of 5 plants or less is usually not prosecuted when they are renounced by the cultivator.

Proponents of gedoogbeleid argue that such a policy practices more consistency in legal protection than without it. Opponents of the Dutch drug policy either call for full legalization, or argue that laws should penalize morally wrong or deviant behavior, whether enforceable or not. In the Dutch courts, however, it has long been determined that the institutionalized non-enforcement of statutes with well defined limits constitutes de facto decriminalization. The statutes are kept on the books mainly due to international pressure and in adherence with international treaties. A November 2008 poll showed that a 60% majority of the Dutch population support the legalisation of soft drugs. The same poll showed that 85% supported closing of all cannabis coffeeshops within 250 meters walking distance from schools.

== Drug law enforcement ==
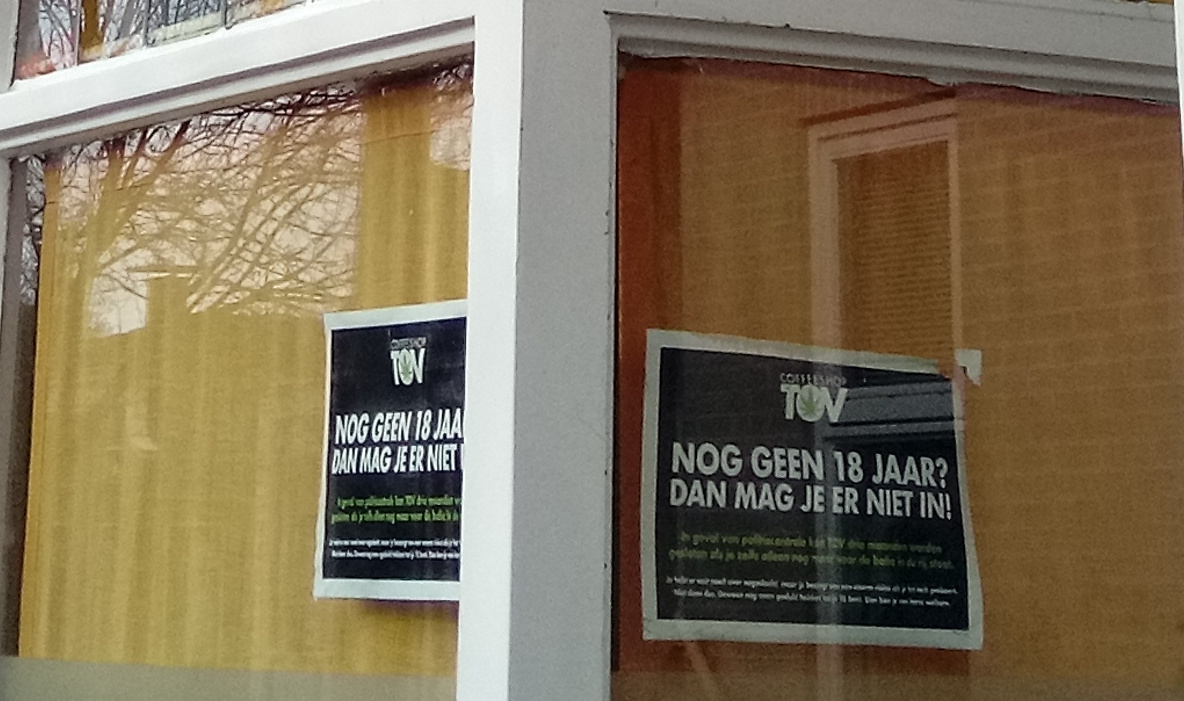
Signs in Dutch informing readers that entry is only permitted to those aged 18 and over

Importing and exporting of any classified drug is a serious offence. The penalty can run up to 12 to 16 years if it is hard drug trade, maximum 4 years for import or export of large quantities of cannabis. It is prohibited to operate a motor vehicle while under the influence of any drug that affects driving ability to such an extent that you are unable to drive properly. (Section 8 of the 1994 Road Traffic Act section 1). The Dutch police have the right to do a drug test if they suspect influenced driving. For example, anybody involved in a traffic accident may be tested. Causing an accident that inflicts bodily harm, while under influence of any drug, is seen as a crime that may be punished by up to 3 years in prison (9 years in case of a fatal accident). Suspension of driving license is also normal in such a case (maximum 5 years). Amsterdam Airport Schiphol has long practiced a zero tolerance policy regarding airline passengers carrying drugs. In 2006 there were 20,769 drug crimes registered by public prosecutors and 4,392 persons received an unconditional prison sentence The rate of imprisonment for drug crimes is about the same as in Sweden, which has a zero tolerance policy for drug crimes.

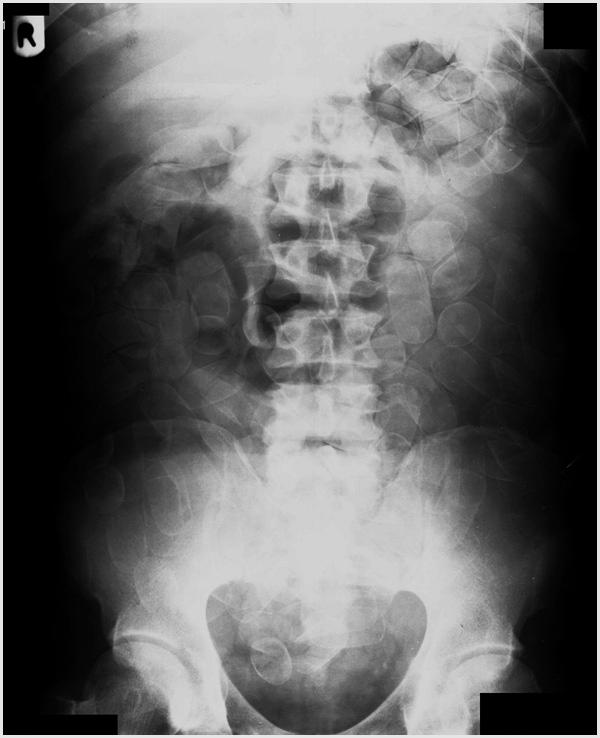
X-ray of a balloon swallower trafficking cocaine

Despite the high priority given by the Dutch government to fighting illegal drug trafficking, the Netherlands continue to be an important transit point for drugs entering Europe. The Netherlands is a major producer and leading distributor of cannabis, heroin, cocaine, amphetamines and other synthetic drugs, and a medium consumer of illicit drugs. Despite the crackdown by Interpol on traffic and illicit manufacture of temazepam, the country has also become a major exporter of illicit temazepam of the jelly variety, trafficking it to the United Kingdom and other European nations. The government has intensified cooperation with neighbouring countries and stepped up border controls. In recent years, it also introduced so-called 100% checks and body scans at Schiphol Airport on incoming flights from Dutch overseas territories Aruba and Netherlands Antilles to prevent importing cocaine by means of swallowing balloons by mules.

Although drug use, as opposed to trafficking, is seen primarily as a public health issue, responsibility for drug policy is shared by both the Ministry of Health, Welfare, and Sports, and the Ministry of Justice.

The Netherlands spends more than €130 million annually on facilities for addicts, of which about fifty percent goes to drug addicts. The Netherlands has extensive demand reduction programs, reaching about ninety percent of the country's 25,000 to 28,000 hard drug users. The number of hard drug addicts has stabilized in the past few years and their average age has risen to 38 years, which is generally seen as a positive trend. Notably, the number of drug-related deaths in the country remains amongst the lowest in Europe as of 2008.

On 27 November 2003, the Dutch Justice Minister Piet Hein Donner announced that his government was considering rules under which coffeeshops would only be allowed to sell soft drugs to Dutch residents in order to satisfy both European neighbors' concerns about the influx of drugs from the Netherlands, as well as those of Netherlands border town residents unhappy with the influx of "drug tourists" from elsewhere in Europe. The European Court of Justice ruled in December 2010 that Dutch authorities can ban coffeeshops from selling cannabis to foreigners. The EU court said the southern Dutch city of Maastricht was within its rights when it introduced a "weed passport" in 2005 to prevent foreigners from entering cafés that sell cannabis.

In 2010 the owner of Netherlands's largest cannabis selling coffeeshop was fined 10 million euros for breaking drug laws by keeping more than the tolerated amount of cannabis in the shop. He was also sentenced to a 16-week prison term.

== Results of the drug policy ==
Criminal investigations into more serious forms of organized crime mainly involve drugs (72%). Most of these are investigations of hard drug crime (specifically cocaine and synthetic drugs) although the number of soft drug cases is rising and currently accounts for 69% of criminal investigations.

In a study of the levels of cannabis, cocaine, MDMA, methamphetamine and other amphetamine in wastewater from 42 major cities in Europe Amsterdam came near the top of the list in every category but methamphetamine.

The Netherlands tolerates the sale of soft drugs in 'coffee shops'. A coffee shop is an establishment where cannabis may be sold subject to certain strict conditions, but no alcoholic drinks may be sold or consumed. The Dutch government does not prosecute members of the public for possession or use of small quantities of soft drugs.

In the province of North Brabant in the south of the Netherlands, organized crime organizations form the main producer of MDMA, amphetamine and cannabis in Europe. Together with the proximity of the ports of Antwerp and especially Rotterdam where heroin and cocaine enter the European continent, this causes these substances to be readily available for a relative low price. Therefore, there is a large quantity of drugs of a relative high purity/quality available. This means that users will not have to rely on more polluted substances with greater health risks. Together with an approach that focuses on easily accessible health care, harm reduction and prevention, this causes the medical condition of the Dutch addicts to be less severe than that of many other countries.

== Implications of international law ==
The Netherlands is a party to the 1961 Single Convention on Narcotic Drugs, the 1971 Convention on Psychotropic Substances, and the 1988 United Nations Convention Against Illicit Traffic in Narcotic Drugs and Psychotropic Substances. The 1961 convention prohibits cultivation and trade of naturally occurring drugs such as cannabis; the 1971 treaty bans the manufacture and trafficking of synthetic drugs such as barbiturates and amphetamines; and the 1988 convention requires states to criminalize illicit drug possession:

Subject to its constitutional principles and the basic concepts of its legal system, each Party shall adopt such measures as may be necessary to establish as a criminal offence under its domestic law, when committed intentionally, the possession, purchase or cultivation of narcotic drugs or psychotropic substances for personal consumption contrary to the provisions of the 1961 Convention, the 1961 Convention as amended or the 1971 Convention.

The International Narcotics Control Board typically interprets this provision to mean that states must prosecute drug possession offenses. The conventions clearly state that controlled substances are to be restricted to scientific and medical uses. However, Cindy Fazey, former Chief of Demand Reduction for the United Nations Drug Control Programme, believes that the treaties have enough ambiguities and loopholes to allow some room to maneuver. In her report entitled The Mechanics and Dynamics of the UN System for International Drug Control, she notes:

Many countries have now decided not to use the full weight of criminal sanctions against people who are in possession of drugs that are for their personal consumption. The Conventions say that there must be an offence under domestic criminal law, it does not say that the law has to be enforced, or that when it is what sanctions should apply. . . . Despite such grey areas latitude is by no means unlimited. The centrality of the principle of limiting narcotic and psychotropic drugs for medical and scientific purposes leaves no room for the legal possibility of recreational use. . . . Nations may currently be pushing the boundaries of the international system, but the pursuit of any action to formally legalize non-medical and non-scientific drug use would require either treaty revision or a complete or partial withdrawal from the current regime.

The Dutch policy of keeping anti-drug laws on the books while limiting enforcement of certain offenses is carefully designed to reduce harm while still complying with the letter of international drug control treaties. This is necessary in order to avoid criticism from the International Narcotics Board, which historically has taken a dim view of any moves to relax official drug policy. In their annual report, the Board has criticised many governments, including Canada, for permitting the medicinal use of cannabis, Australia for providing injecting rooms and the United Kingdom for proposing to downgrade the classification of cannabis, which it has since done (although this change was reversed by the Home Secretary on 7 May 2008 against the advice of its own commissioned report).

== Developments from 2003–2015 ==
The liberal drug policy of the authorities in the Netherlands especially led to problems in "border hot spots" that attracted "drug tourism" as well as trafficking and related law enforcement problems in towns like Enschede in the East and Terneuzen, Venlo, Maastricht and Heerlen in the South. In 2006, Gerd Leers, then mayor of the border city of Maastricht, on the Dutch-Belgian border, criticised the current policy as inconsistent, by recording a song with the Dutch punk rock band De Heideroosjes. By allowing possession and retail sales of cannabis, but not cultivation or wholesale, the government creates numerous problems of crime and public safety, he alleges, and therefore he would like to switch to either legalising and regulating production, or to the full repression that his party (CDA) officially advocates. The latter suggestion has widely been interpreted as rhetorical. Leers's comments have garnered support from other local authorities and put the cultivation issue back on the agenda.

In November 2008, Pieter van Geel, the leader of the CDA (Christian Democrats) in the Dutch parliament, called for a ban on the cafés where cannabis is sold. He said the practice of allowing so-called coffeeshops to operate had failed. The CDA had the support of its smaller coalition partner, the CU (ChristenUnie), but the third party in government, PvdA (Labour), opposed. The coalition agreement worked out by the three coalition parties in 2007 stated that there would be no change in the policy of tolerance. Prominent CDA member Gerd Leers spoke out against him: cannabis users who now cause no trouble would be viewed as criminals if an outright ban was to be implemented. Van Geel later said that he respected the coalition agreement and would not press for a ban during the current government's tenure.

27 coffeeshops selling cannabis in Rotterdam, all within 200 metres of schools, were ordered to close down by 2009. This was nearly half of the coffeeshops that operated within its municipality. This was due to the new policy of city mayor Ivo Opstelten and the town council. The higher levels of the active ingredient in cannabis in the Netherlands create a growing opposition to the traditional Dutch view of cannabis as a relatively innocent soft drug. Supporters of coffeeshops state that such claims are often exaggerated and ignore the fact that higher content means a user needs to use less of the plant to get the desired effects, making it in effect safer. Dutch research has however shown that an increase of THC content also increase the occurrence of impaired psychomotor skills, particularly among younger or inexperienced cannabis smokers, who do not adapt their smoking-style to the higher THC content. Closing of coffeeshops is not unique to Rotterdam. Many other towns have done the same in the last 10 years.

In 2008, the municipality of Utrecht imposed a Zero Tolerance Policy to all events like the big dance party Trance Energy held in Jaarbeurs. However, such zero-tolerance policy at dance parties are now becoming common in the Netherlands and are even stricter in cities like Arnhem.

The two towns Roosendaal and Bergen op Zoom announced in October 2008 that they would start closing all coffeeshops, each week visited by up to 25,000 French and Belgian drug tourists, with closures beginning in February 2009.

In May 2011 the Dutch government announced that tourists are to be banned from Dutch coffeeshops, starting in the southern provinces and at the end of 2011 in the rest of the country. In a letter to the parliament, the Dutch health and justice ministers said that, "In order to tackle the nuisance and criminality associated with coffeeshops and drug trafficking, the open-door policy of coffeeshops will end".

A government committee delivered in June 2011 a report about cannabis to the Dutch government. It includes a proposal that cannabis with more than 15 percent THC should be labeled as hard drugs. Higher concentrations of THC and drug tourism have challenged the current policy and led to a re-examination of the current approach; e.g. ban of all sales of cannabis to tourists in coffeeshops from end of 2011 was proposed but currently only the border city of Maastricht has adopted the measure in order to test out its feasibility. According to the initial measure, starting in 2012, each coffeeshop was to operate like a private club with some 1,000 to 1,500 members. In order to qualify for a membership card, applicants would have to be adult Dutch citizens, membership was only to be allowed in one club.

In Amsterdam 26 coffeeshops in the De Wallen area were ordered to close their doors between 1 September 2012 and 31 August 2015.

A Dutch judge has ruled that tourists can legally be banned from entering cannabis cafés, as part of new restrictions which come into force in 2012.

A study conducted by the European Monitoring Centre for Drugs and Drug Addiction report that 25.3% of Irish people smoked cannabis at some stage in their life, and 25.7% of Dutch people have tried cannabis.

=== Law banning "magic mushrooms" ===
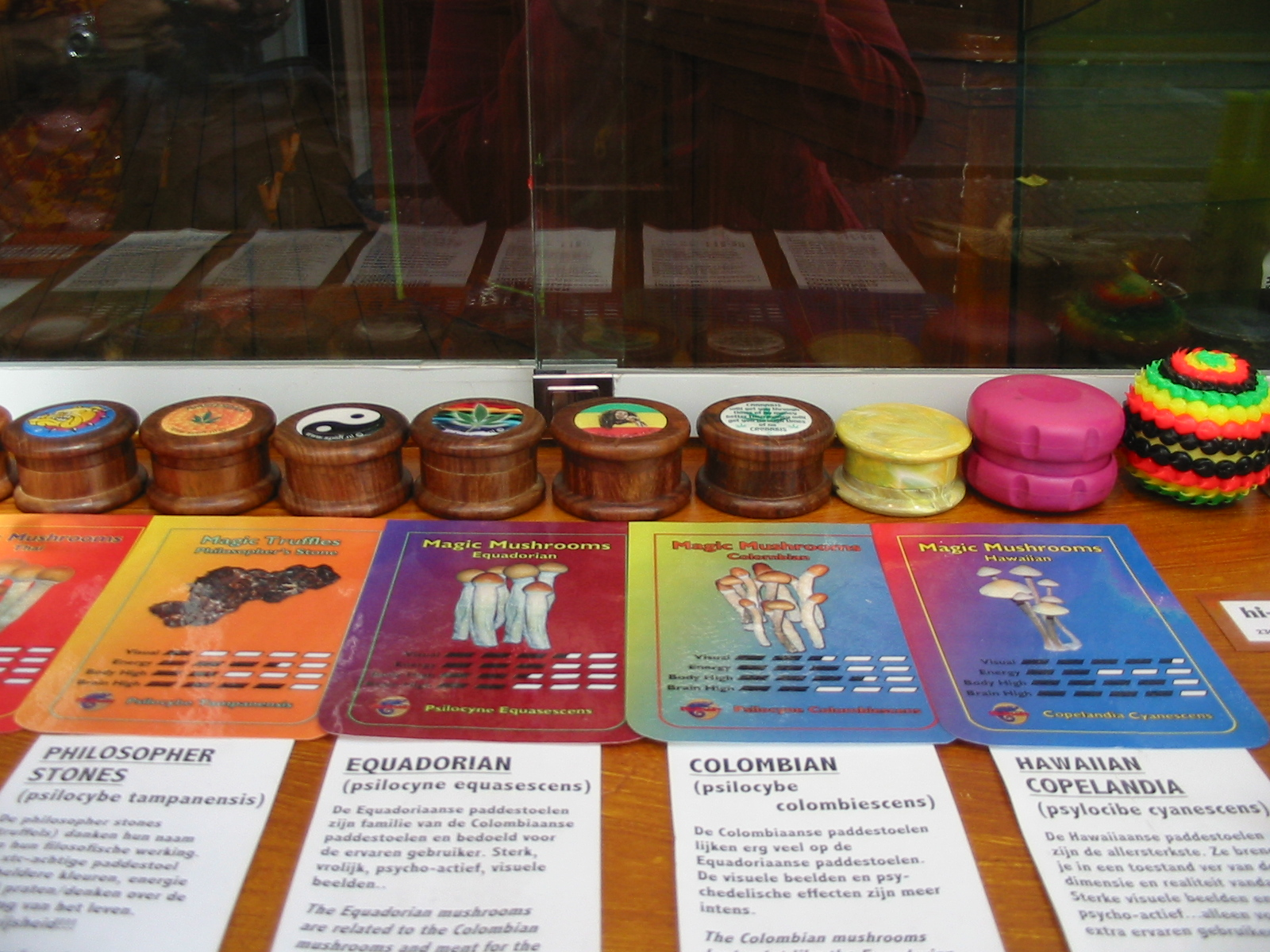
Different hallucinogenic mushrooms on display in Amsterdam, Netherlands in 2007.

In October 2007, the prohibition of psychedelic or "magic mushrooms" was announced by the Dutch authorities.

On 25 April 2008, the Dutch government, backed by a majority of members of parliament, decided to ban cultivation and use of all magic mushrooms. Amsterdam mayor Job Cohen proposed a three-day cooling period in which clients would be informed three days before actually procuring the mushrooms and if they would still like to go through with it they could pick up their spores from the smart shop. The ban has been considered a retreat from liberal drug policies. This followed a few deadly incidents mostly involving tourists. These deaths were not directly caused by the use of the drug per se, but by deadly accidents occurring while under the influence of magic mushrooms.

As of 1 December 2008, all psychedelic mushrooms are banned. However, sclerotia (what are termed as "truffles" and which have similar effects to magic mushrooms), mushroom spores, and active mycellium cultures remain legal and are readily available in "smartshops", which are urban stores that sell legal drugs, herbs and related gadgets.

=== Supply control ===
The relatively recent increase in the cocaine trafficking business has been largely focused on the Caribbean area. Since early 2003, a special law court with prison facilities has been operational at Schiphol airport. Since the beginning of 2005, there has been 100% control of all flights from key countries in the Caribbean. In 2004, an average of 290 drug couriers per month were arrested, decreasing to 80 per month by early 2006.

== See also ==
- 2014 Amsterdam drug deaths
- Arguments for and against drug prohibition
- Cannabis in the Netherlands
- Designer drug
- Drug liberalization
- Legality of cannabis by country
- Minors and the legality of cannabis
- Portugal 2001 decriminalization of drug use
