= Dutch pot =

Dutch pot may refer to:

- Legality of marijuana in the Netherlands
- An alternative name for a Dutch oven
