= Smoking in Pakistan =

Tobacco smoking in Pakistan is legal, but under certain circumstances is banned. If calculated on per day basis, 177 million cigarettes per day were consumed in FY-14. According to the Pakistan Demographic Health Survey, 46 per cent men and 5.7 per cent women smoke tobacco. The habit is mostly found in the youth of Pakistan and in farmers, and is thought to be responsible for various health problems and deaths in the country. Pakistan has the highest consumption of tobacco in South Asia.

== Fiscal Year 2023 ==
Pakistanis spent Rs. 250 billion on over 64 billion cigarettes in the financial year FY-14 according to a State Bank report recently issued. The State Bank's Statistical Bulletin reports that Pakistanis smoked 64.48bn cigarettes in the year FY-14. The average price of cigarette is considered Rs5 (conservative estimate) and the total price of 64.48bn cigarettes comes to an estimated Rs258bn. The most popular brand Gold Leaf is available at Rs 500 per pack of 20 cigarettes or Rs 30 per cigarette. The minimum price of cigarettes available in the market is Rs 50 per pack of 20 cigarettes or Rs1.25 per cigarette. Costly imported cigarettes are also available in the market which can go up to Rs 600 plus per pack. The main 3 companies took major part in tobacco industry. There are a number of smuggled cigarettes which find their way from Afghanistan whose landing port is in Karachi, Pakistan.

== Effects on health ==
90% of Lung cancer in Pakistan are caused directly by tobacco. It claims the lives of 163,600 people every year; nearly 31,000 of those deaths are from inhaling second-hand smoke.

According to the study conducted by Sustainable Development Policy Institute (SDPI) on national treasury versus public health (2018–19), it was learned that there are above 23.9 million tobacco users in the country, out of which 125000 are dying every year because of tobacco inducted diseases. and tobacco usage is still increasing day by day and mostly are children.

== Smoking fashion ==
A high amount of the youth in Karachi are addicted to tobacco smoking. Smoking hookah has been prevalent in rural areas for generations. In September 2018, The Supreme Court of Pakistan ordered all provincial governments across Pakistan to enforce the already existing ban on hookah cafes.

== Smoking alternatives ==
Smoking alternatives, such as vape products, were introduced in Pakistan in 2013, and have since then grown to a niche market, with many local brands opening shops across the country. However, teenagers in Pakistan have a negative attitude towards the use of e-cigarettes. Another smoking alternative in Pakistan is nicotine pouches. Launched by the Pakistan Tobacco Company (PTC), a part of British American Tobacco (BAT), Velo Nicotine Pouches are tobacco free and delivered nicotine through oral absorption that does not involve any combustion. Electrical cigarettes or vapes have been also introduced and sold as anti-smoking campaign by the company Buzz On Club, owned by renowned Pakistani social media stars.

== See also ==
- History of smoking
- Tobacco smoking
