= Smoking in Norway =

Smoking policy in Norway

Enforcement of smoking bans is strong in Norway

Smoking in Norway is banned indoors in public buildings and aboard aircraft or other means of public transport. In addition, it is illegal to smoke in outdoor locations that are close to children's schools and hospitals, and it is illegal to advertise, promote or sponsor any tobacco products to the public; however, this law does not apply to tobacconist shops which are allowed to advertise tobacco related products.

The legal age to buy tobacco is 18 years in Norway, but 10%-12% of 15-year-olds smoke daily or weekly, and 31% of adults smoke daily or occasionally. The overall proportion of smokers is decreasing.

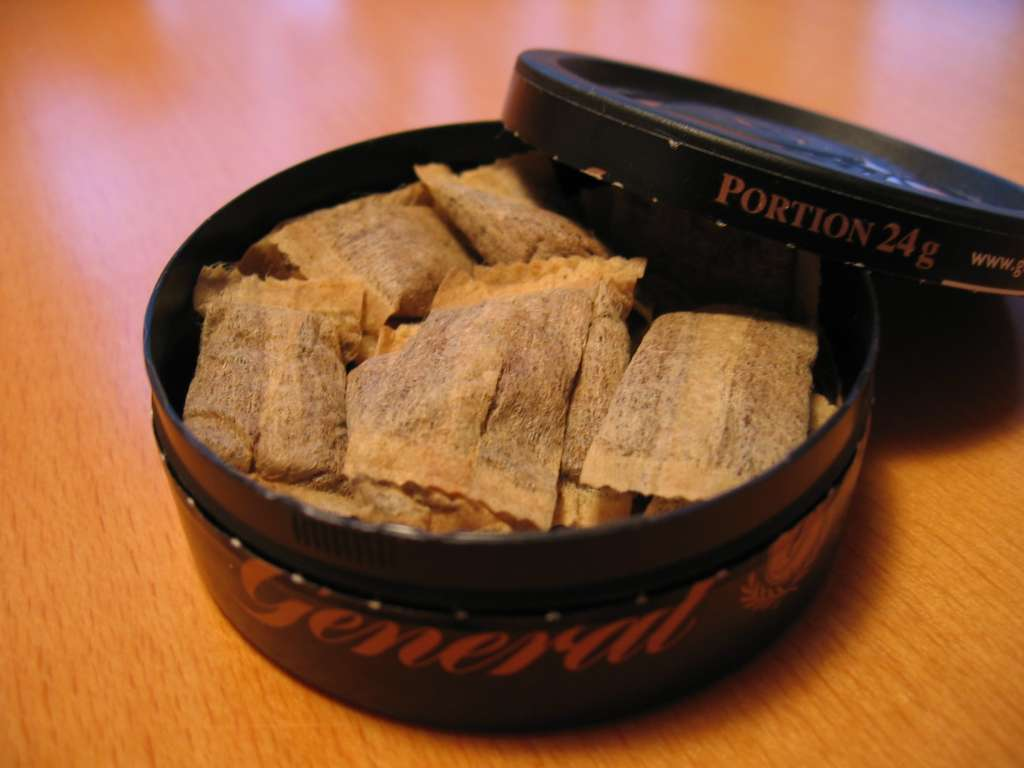
Approximately 17% of adult men and 4% of adult women use snus daily or occasionally

In Norway in 2008, approximately 17% of adult men used snus daily or occasionally, while 4% of adult women used snus daily or occasionally. In secondary schools in 2000–2004, 21% of boys and 4% of girls used snus daily or occasionally. Many people both smoke and use snus.

The proportion of smokers is higher among immigrants to Norway than among ethnic Norwegians. The highest proportion of smokers can be found among immigrants from Turkey, Iran, Vietnam and Pakistan.

== See also ==
- European Tobacco Products Directive
- Health in Norway
