= Route 36 (bar) =

Cocaine bar

Route 36 is an illegal after-hours lounge in La Paz, Bolivia, and according to The Guardian it is the world's first cocaine bar; however, this description has been argued as being inaccurate. Although cocaine, an addictive stimulant derived from the coca plant, is illegal in Bolivia, political corruption and affordability of locally produced cocaine have resulted in Route 36 becoming a popular destination for thousands of drug tourists each year.

== History ==
The concept of Route 36 as a cocaine bar was created in the late-2000s. Entry is often only granted by local taxi drivers vouching for potential patrons or by patrons being asked questions by the door security staff to ascertain that they are not undercover police officers. Many customers learn about the bar's existence through travel websites and by word of mouth promotion. To avoid complaints from nearby business owners or residents, Route 36 does not operate in the same location for more than a few weeks at a time. Its location can only be found by word of mouth information. The location is usually known locally, with opponents of the bar often refusing to tell tourists asking about it where it is on the grounds of the illegality of cocaine and belief it was giving Bolivia a bad name. At Route 36, consumption of cocaine is actively encouraged with bartenders often offering it after any drinks-only orders are made; however, some media commentators have speculated that the bar provides low quality cocaine in order to cater to the drug tourist market.
