= History of smoking =

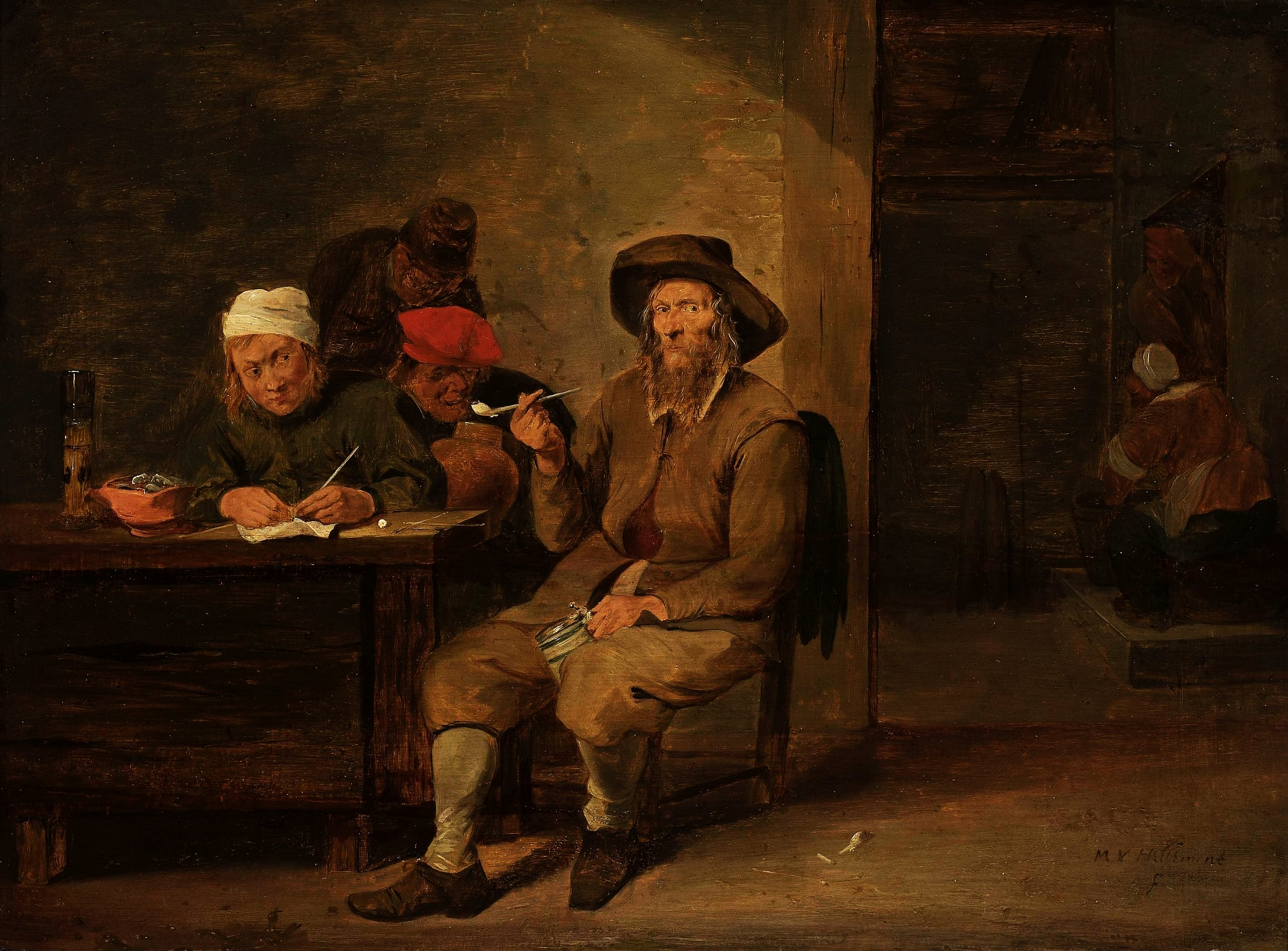
Smokers in an Inn by Mattheus van Hellemont (1650s)

The history of smoking dates back to as early as 5000 BC in the Americas in shamanistic rituals. With the arrival of the Europeans in the 16th century, the consumption, cultivation, and trading of tobacco quickly spread. The modernization of farming equipment and manufacturing increased the availability of cigarettes following the reconstruction era in the United States. Mass production quickly expanded the scope of consumption, which grew until the scientific controversies of the 1960s, and condemnation in the 1980s.

In Eurasia, cannabis was common before the arrival of tobacco, and is known to have been used since at least 5000 BC. Cannabis was not commonly smoked directly until tobacco came into widespread use in the 16th century. Before this cannabis and numerous other plants were vaporized on hot rocks or charcoal, burned as incense or in vessels and censers and inhaled indirectly. Evidence of direct smoking before the 16th century is contentious, with pipes thought to have been used to smoke cannabis dated to the 10th to 12th centuries found in Southeastern Africa.

Previously eaten for its medicinal properties, opium smoking became widespread in China and the West during the 19th century. These led to the establishment of opium dens. In the latter half of the century, opium smoking became popular in the artistic communities of Europe. While opium dens continued to exist throughout the world, the trend among the Europeans abated during the First World War, and among the Chinese under the Mao regime.

More widespread cigarette usage as well as increased life expectancy during the 1920s made adverse health effects more noticeable. In 1929, Fritz Lickint of Dresden, Germany, published formal statistical evidence of a cancer–tobacco link. The subject remained largely taboo until 1954 with the British Doctors Study, and in 1964 United States Surgeon General's report. Tobacco became stigmatized, which led to the largest civil settlement in United States history, the Tobacco Master Settlement (MSA), in 1998.

== Early usages ==
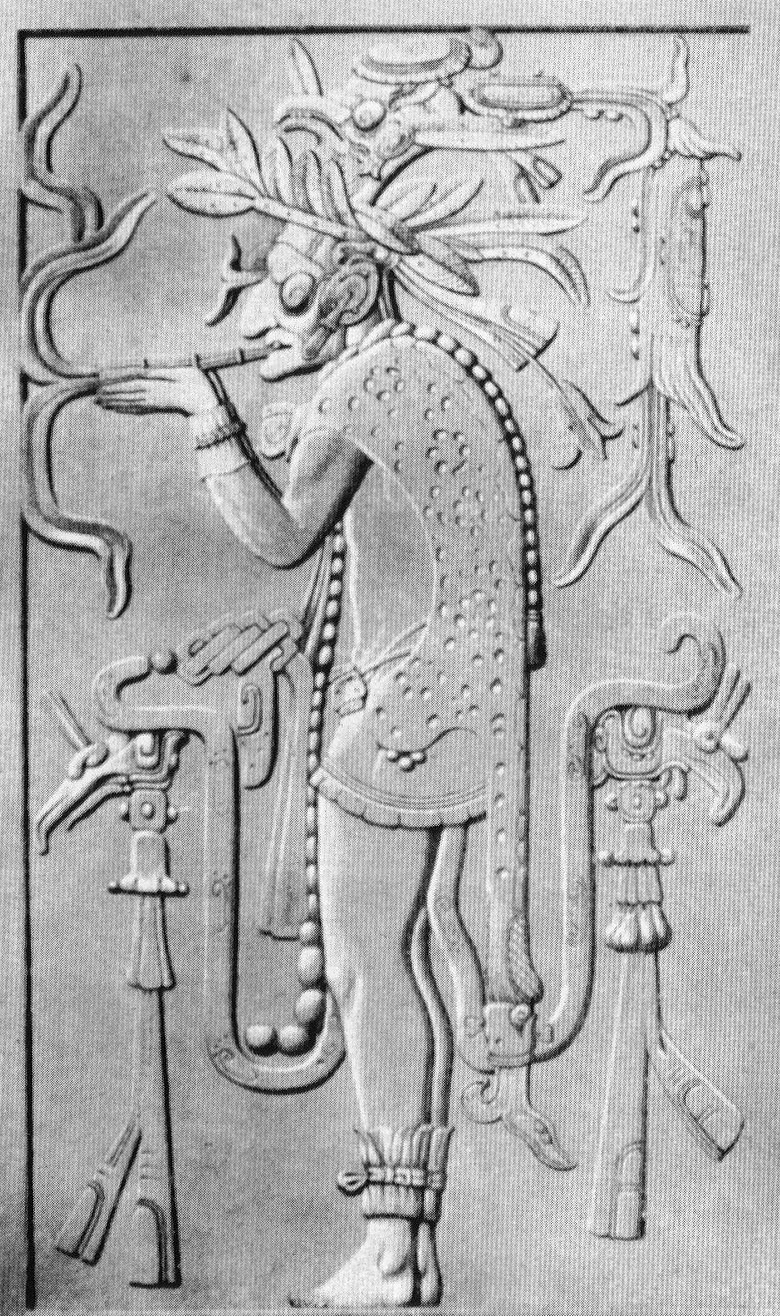
A carving from the temple at Palenque, Mexico, depicting a Mayan priest using a smoking tube

Smoking has been practiced in one form or another since ancient times. Tobacco and various hallucinogenic drugs were smoked all over the Americas as early as 5000 BC in shamanistic rituals and originated in the Peruvian and Ecuadorian Andes. Many ancient civilizations, such as the Babylonians, Indians and Chinese, burnt incense as a part of religious rituals, as did the Israelites and the later Catholic and Orthodox churches. However, the burning of incense is not direct inhalation. It has been suggested that cannabis resin or possibly opium was at times included in this incense. It is unknown how much resin this incense would have contained and if it came from psychoactive types of cannabis or possibly was opium. The ancient Assyrians employed cannabis fumes as a cure for "poison of the limbs", presumed to mean arthritis.

The Greek historian Herodotos wrote that the Scythians vaporized cannabis seeds as part of their cultural rituals. He wrote that after a funeral procession held for one of their kings:

They make a booth by fixing in the ground three sticks inclined towards one another, and stretching around them woolen felts which they arrange so as to fit as close as possible: inside the booth a dish is placed upon the ground into which they put a number of red-hot stones and then add some hemp seed. At once it begins to smoke, giving off a vapor unsurpassed by any vapor-bath one could find in Greece. The Scythians delighted shout for joy.

Herodotos' Scythians had constructed a sweat lodge - as used ritualistically by a number of different peoples. In 1947–1949 Sergei Ivanovich Rudenko excavated a Scythian burial site that included a miniature version at Pazyryk in the Tien Shen Mountains. A leather pouch containing cannabis seed was attached to one pole of the tent. Coriander seeds have also been discovered in this kurgan. Likely a mixture of cannabis seeds and coriander seeds was vaporized on the hot rocks to create a thick fragrant if not psychoactive smoke for ritual bathing.

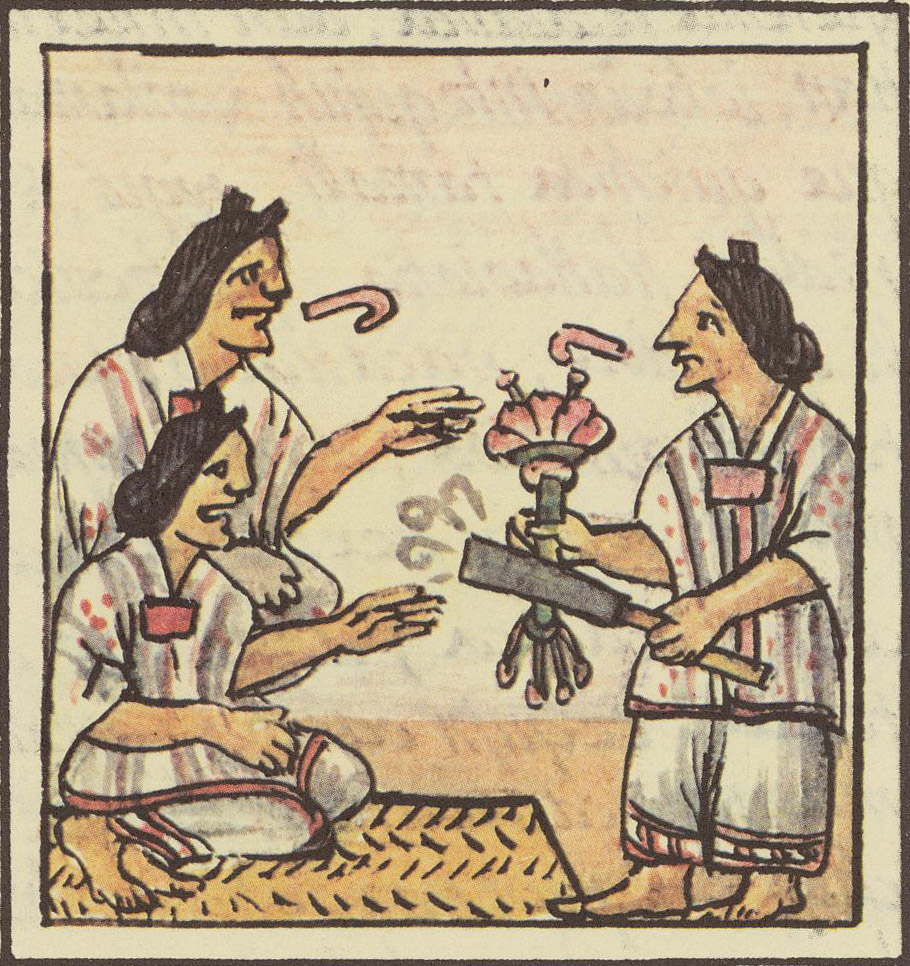
Aztec women are handed flowers and smoking tubes before eating at a banquet. Florentine Codex, 16th century.

Robicsek posits that smoking in the Americas probably originated in incense-burning ceremonies, and was later adopted for pleasure or as a social tool. The Maya employed it in classical times (at least from the 10th century) and the Aztecs included it in their mythology. The Aztec goddess Cihuacoahuatl had a body consisting of tobacco, and the priests who performed human sacrifices wore tobacco gourds as symbols of divinity. Even today certain Tzeltal Maya sacrifice 13 calabashes of tobacco at New Year. The smoking of tobacco and of various other hallucinogenic drugs was used to achieve trances and to come into contact with the spirit world. Reports from the first European explorers and conquistadors to reach the Americas tell of rituals where native priests smoked themselves into such high degrees of intoxication that it is unlikely that the rituals were limited to just tobacco. No concrete evidence of exactly what they smoked exists, but the most probable theory is that the tobacco was much stronger, consumed in extreme amounts, or was mixed with other, unknown psychoactive drugs.

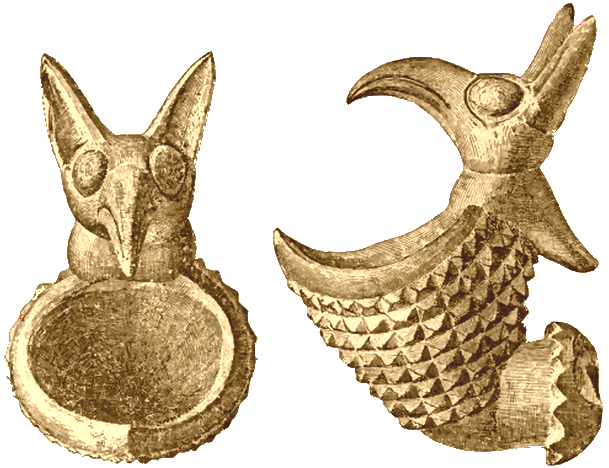
A ceremonial pipe of the Mississippian culture

In early North America the most common form of smoking by indigenous peoples involved pipes, either for social or for religious purposes (which varied between different cultures). Sometimes pipes were smoked by representatives of warring tribes, and later with European settlers, as a gesture of goodwill, diplomacy, or to seal a peace treaty (hence the misnomer, "peace pipe"). In the Caribbean, Mexico and Central and South America, early forms of cigarettes - including smoking reeds or cigars - were the most common smoking tools. Only in modern times has the use of pipes become fairly widespread. Smoking is depicted in engravings and on various types of pottery from as early as the 9th century, but it is not known whether it was limited to just the upper class and priests.

After Europeans arrived in the Americas in the late 15th century, tobacco smoking as a recreational activity became widespread. At the banquets of Aztec nobles, the meal would commence by passing out fragrant flowers and smoking tubes for the dinner guests. At the end of the feast, which would last all night, the remaining flowers, smoking tubes, and food would be given as a kind of alms to old and poor people who had been invited to witness the social occasion, or would be given as a reward to the servants.

Four baked-clay, non-Arab produced pipes were found at the Iron Age Sebanzi Hill site in the Lochinvar National Park, Zambia. Radiocarbon dating, along with related pottery, on the two oldest specimens indicates they were in use around the 10th to 12th century CE. The pipes have not been chemically analyzed; it has been argued they were used for smoking cannabis because they predate the introduction of tobacco. North of Zambia, in Ethiopia, the remains of two ceramic waterpipe bowls were recovered from Lalibela Cave and dated to 640–500 BP. Both contained trace amounts of THC according to modified thin-layer chromatography. These reports are controversial because these dates predate the exploration of the New World by Spain and the supposed first introduction of tobacco, pipes, and smoking from the New World into Eurasia.

== Popularization of smoking ==
=== Europe ===
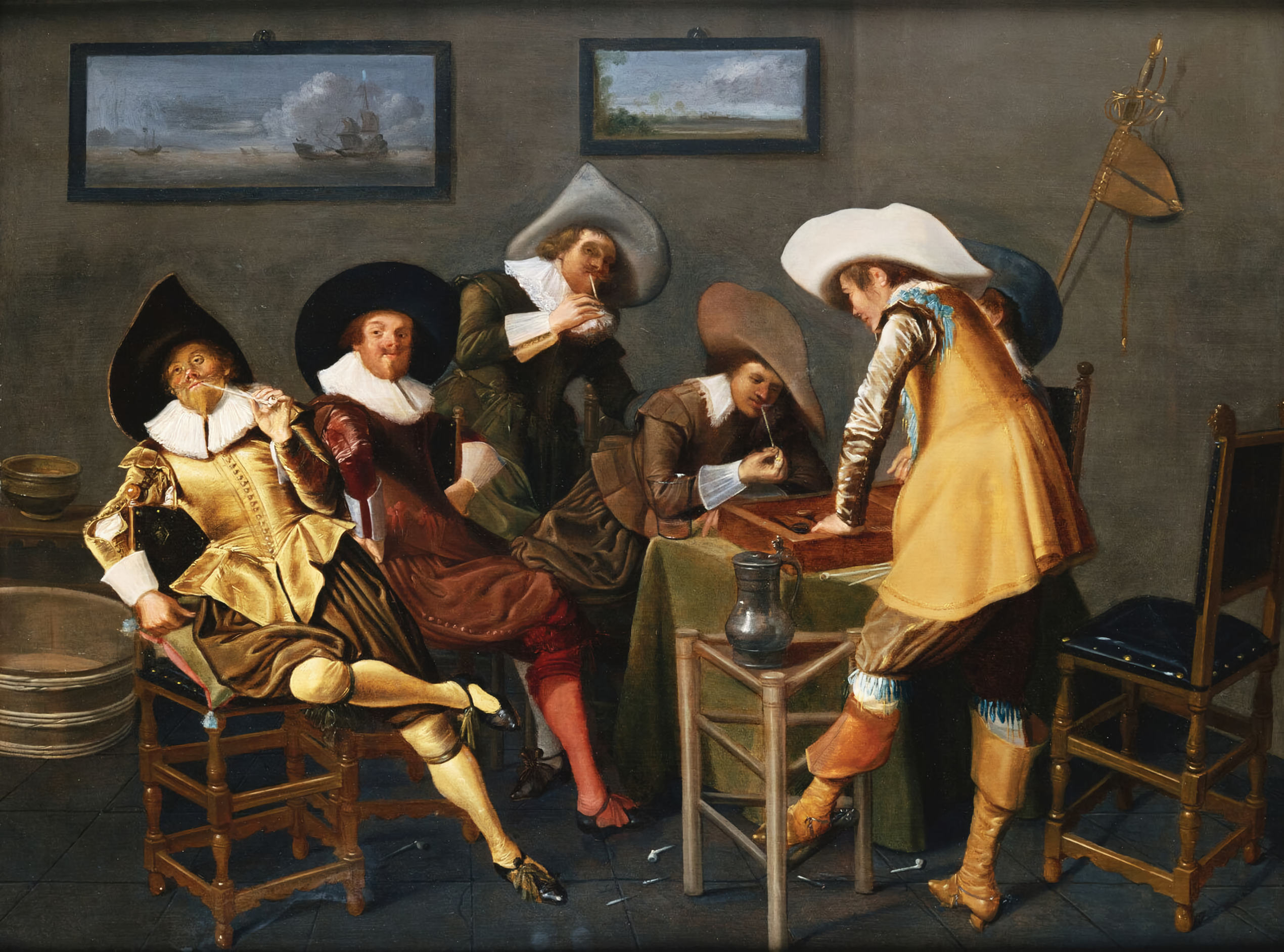
Gentlemen Smoking and Playing Backgammon in a Tavern by Dirck Hals, 1627

A Frenchman named Jean Nicot (from whose name the word nicotine derives) introduced tobacco to France in 1560 from Portugal. From there, it spread to England. The first report of a smoking Englishman is of a sailor in Bristol in 1556, seen "emitting smoke from his nostrils". Like tea, coffee and opium, tobacco was just one of many intoxicants originally used as a form of medicine.

Early modern European medical science was still to a great extent based on humorism, the idea that everything had a specific humoral nature that varied between hot and cold, dry and moist. Tobacco was often seen as something that was beneficial in its heating and drying properties and was assigned an endless list of beneficial properties. The concept of ingesting substances in the form of smoke was also entirely new and was met with both astonishment and great skepticism by Europeans.

The debate raged among priests, scientists and laymen about whether tobacco was a bane or boon and both sides had powerful supporters. The English king James I was one of the first outspoken skeptics and wrote A Counterblaste to Tobacco, an unforgiving literary assault on what he believed was a menace to society. Though rife with, at times, irrelevant and partial arguments, it did address some of the health issues and pointed out the peculiar fact that tobacco was frequently assigned conflicting, and at times almost miraculous, properties:

It makes a man sober that was drunke. It refreshes a weary man, and yet makes a man hungry. Being taken when they goe to bed, it makes one sleepe soundly, and yet being taken when a man is sleepie and drowsie, it will, as they say, awake his braine, and quicken his understanding. As for curing of the Pockes, it serves for that use but among the pockie Indian slaves. Here in England it is refined, and will not deigne to cure heere any other than cleanly and gentlemanly diseases.

=== South and Southeast Asia ===
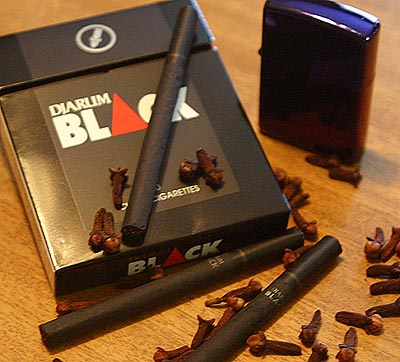
Djarum Blacks, a popular brand of Indonesian clove-flavoured cigarettes called kretek

Cannabis 'smoking' in India has been known since at least 2000 BC and is first mentioned in the Atharvaveda, which dates back a few hundred years BC. Fumigation (dhupa) and fire offerings (homa) are prescribed in the Ayurveda for medical purposes and have been practiced for at least 3,000 years while smoking, dhumrapana (literally "drinking smoke"), has been practiced for at least 2,000 years. Always the cannabis was burned in an open vessel or censer rather than being smoked in a pipe or rolled into a cigarette.

Fumigation and fire offerings have been performed with various substances, including clarified butter (ghee), fish offal, dried snake skins, and various pastes molded around incense sticks and lit to spread the smoke over wide areas. The practice of inhaling smoke was employed as a remedy for many different ailments. It was not limited to just cannabis; various plants and medicinal concoctions recommended to promote general health were also used.

Before modern times, smoking was done with pipes with stems of various lengths, or chillums. Today dhumrapana has been replaced almost entirely by cigarette smoking, but both dhupa and homa are still practiced. Beedi, a type of hand-rolled herbal cigarette consisting of cloves, ground betel nut, and tobacco, usually with a rather low proportion of tobacco, is a modern descendant of the historical dhumrapana.

In Indonesia, a specific type of cigarette that includes cloves called kretek was invented in the early 1880s as a way of delivering the therapeutic properties of clove oil, or eugenol, to the lungs. It quickly became a popular cough remedy, and in the early 20th century kretek, producers began to market pre-rolled clove cigarettes. In the 1960s and 1970s, kretek took on the form of a national symbol, with tax breaks compared to "white" cigarettes and the production began to shift from traditional hand-rolling to machine-rolling.

The industrial method passed the hand-rolled type in numbers in the mid-1980s and today kretek dominates up to 90% of the Indonesian cigarette market. The production is one of the largest sources of income for the Indonesian government and the production, which is spread out among some 500 independent manufacturers, employs some 180,000 people directly and over 10 million indirectly.

=== The Middle East ===
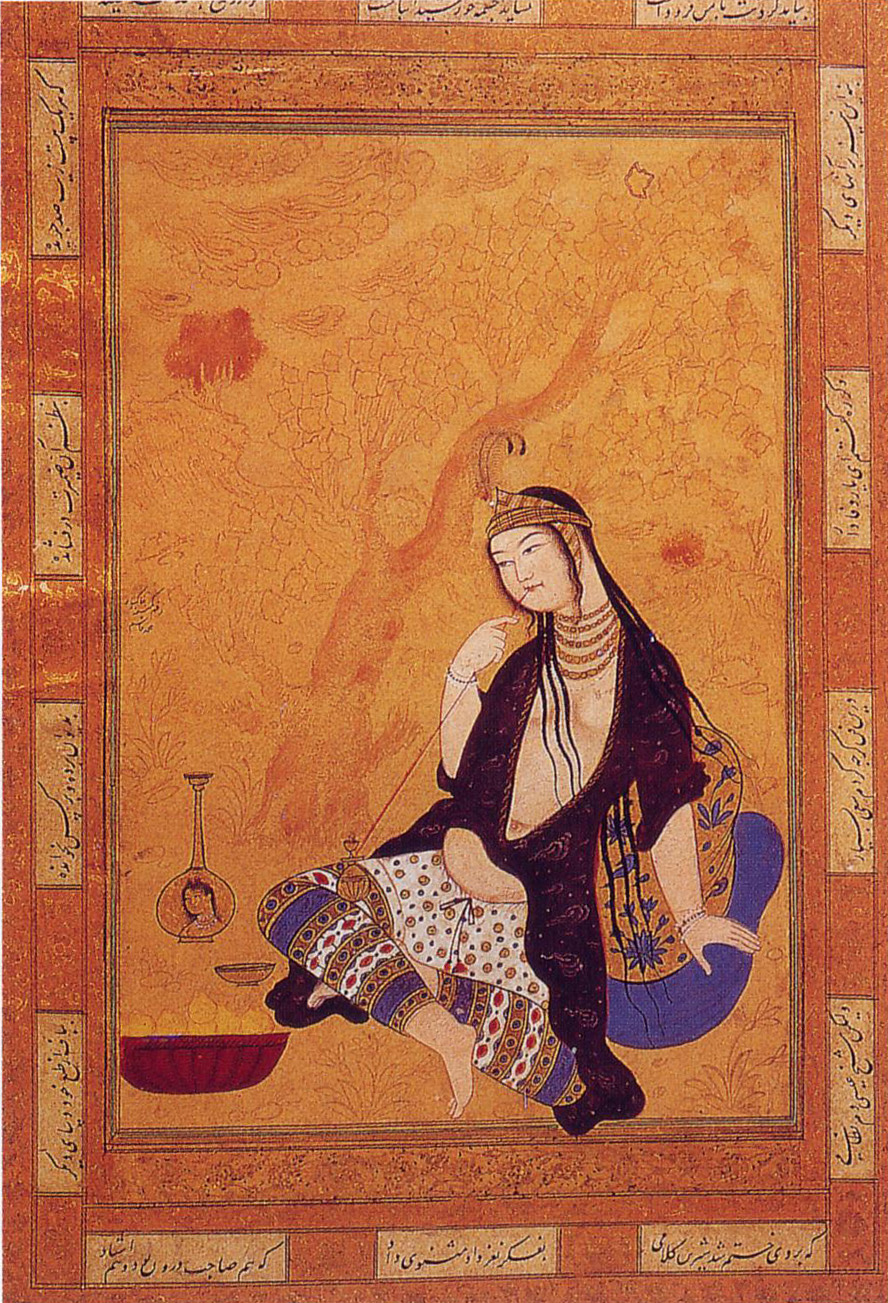
A Persian girl smoking by Muhammad Qasim. Isfahan, 17th century.

Waterpipes were introduced into Persia and the Middle East in the 16th century from India. At first these pipes were used to smoke tobacco but very quickly cannabis flowers and hashish were mixed in. As tobacco use exploded across the Middle East and Northern Africa the hashish trade blossomed within a few decades. During the 16th and 17th centuries, hashish smoking quickly gained in popularity across Eurasia, from Turkey to Nepal, peaking during more modern times in the late 19th and early 20th centuries. Throughout the 18th century, the technique of gathering and drying cannabis plants to make hashish became increasingly widespread as mass production became necessary to satisfy the rapidly increasing Eurasian hashish trade.

Today, the pipes often had several tubes to accommodate multiple smokers, or smokers would pass the nozzle around in the many smoking houses that functioned as social hubs in major centers of Muslim culture like Istanbul, Baghdad, and Cairo. Smoking, especially after the introduction of tobacco, was an essential component of Muslim society and culture and became integrated with important traditions like weddings and funerals, and was expressed in architecture, clothing, literature and poetry.

There is a reference to tobacco in a Persian poem dating from before 1536, but because of the lack of any corroborating sources, the authenticity of the source has been questioned. The next reliable eyewitness account of tobacco smoking is by a Spanish envoy in 1617, but by this time the practice was already deeply engrained in Persian society.

The waterpipe called Argila (or hookah) was created in Persia. The pipes of the rich were made of finely crafted glass and precious metals while common people used coconuts with bamboo tubing, and these were used to smoke cannabis before the arrival of tobacco.

The two substances in combination became very popular and were also smoked in normal "dry" pipes. The waterpipe, however, remained the most common smoking tool until the introduction of the cigarette in the 20th century. Foreign visitors to the region often remarked that smoking was immensely popular among Persians. On Ramadan, the Muslim period of fasting when no food is eaten while the sun is up, among the first thing many Persians did after sunset was light their pipes.

Both sexes smoked, but for women it was a private affair enjoyed in the seclusion of private homes. In the 19th century Iran was one of the world's largest tobacco exporters, and the habit had by then become a national Iranian trait.

=== East Asia ===
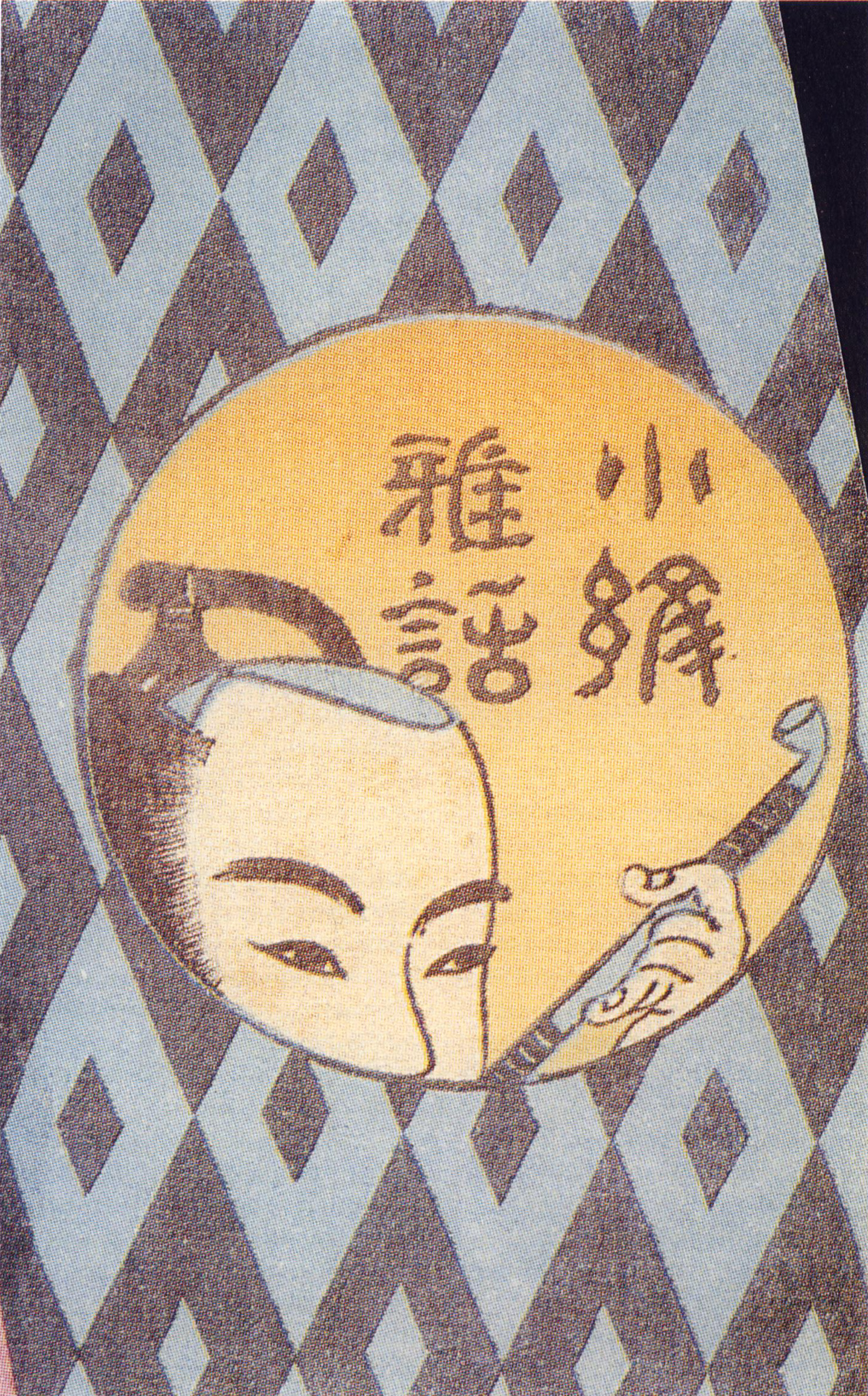
A man smoking a kiseru on the cover of Komon gawa ("Elegant chats on fashion"), a novel by Santō Kyōden published in 1790

After the European discovery of the Americas, tobacco spread to Asia—first via Spanish and Portuguese sailors, and later by the Dutch and English. Spain and Portugal were active in Central and South America, where cigarettes and cigars were the smoking tools of choice, and their sailors smoked mostly cigars. The English and Dutch had contact with the pipe-smoking natives of North America, and adopted the habit. While the Southern Europeans began smoking earlier, it was the long-stemmed pipes of the northerners that became popular in East and Southeast Asia. Tobacco smoking arrived through expatriates in the Philippines and was introduced as early as the 1570s.

By the early 17th century the kiseru, a long-stemmed Japanese pipe inspired by Dutch clay pipes, was common enough to be mentioned in Buddhist textbooks for children. The practice of tobacco smoking evolved as a part of the Japanese tea ceremony by employing many of the traditional objects used to burn incense for tobacco smoking. The kō-bon (the incense tray) became the tabako-bon, the incense burner evolved into a pot for tobacco embers and the incense pot became an ashtray.

During the Edo period, weapons were frequently used as objects of ostentation, indicating wealth and social status. Since only samurai were allowed to carry weapons, an elaborate kiseru slung from the waist served a similar purpose. After the Meiji restoration and abolition of the caste system, many craftsmen who previously decorated swords switched to designing kiserus and buckles for tobacco pouches. Though mass-production of cigarettes began in the late 19th century, not until after World War II did the kiseru go out of style and become an object of tradition and relative obscurity.

=== Sub-Saharan Africa ===
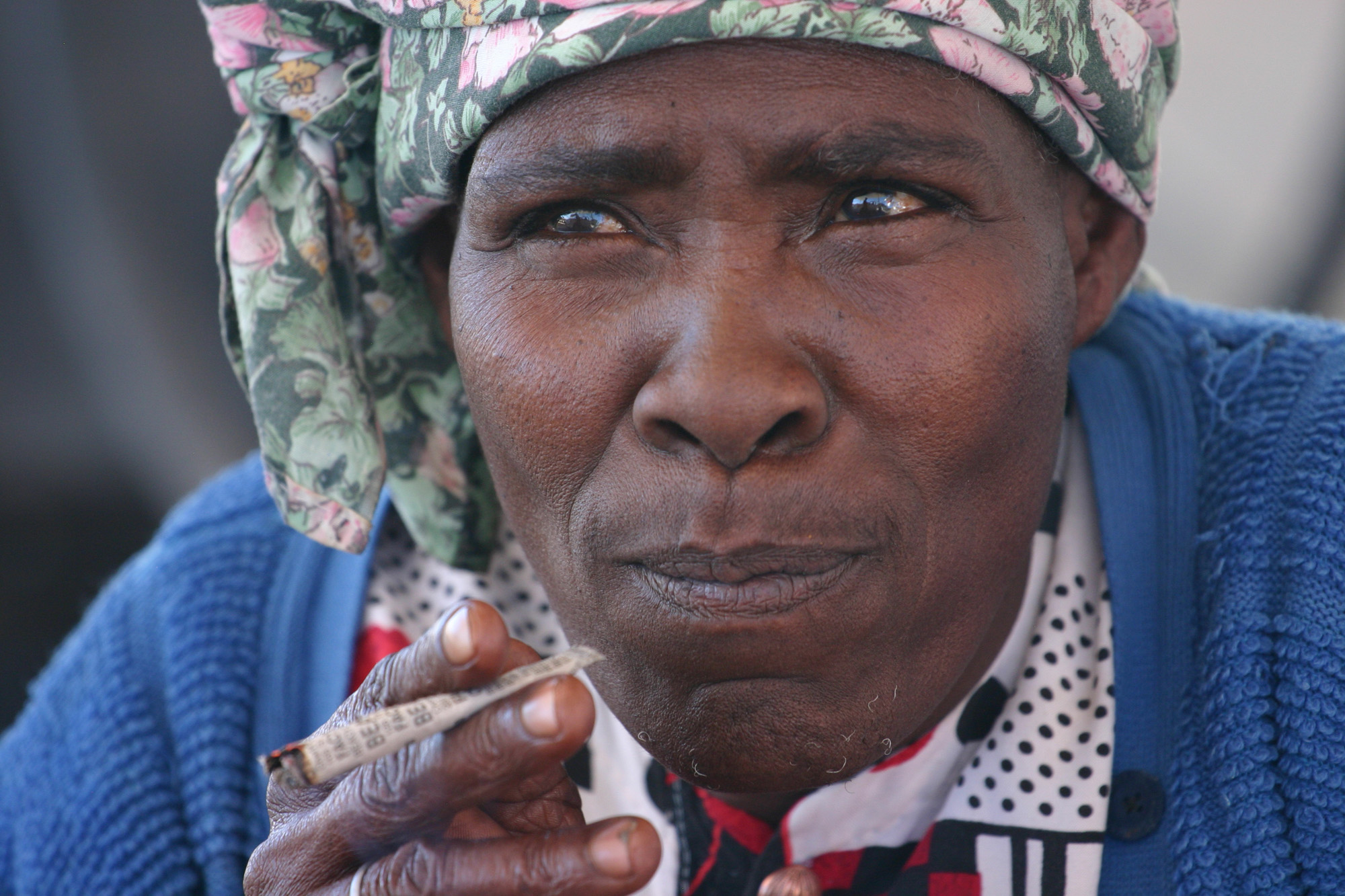
A Nama woman smoking in the Kalahari Desert in Namibia

Around 1600, French merchants introduced tobacco in what is now Gambia and Senegal. At the same time, caravans from Morocco brought tobacco to the area around Timbuktu, and the Portuguese brought the commodity (and the plant) to southern Africa. This established the popularity of tobacco throughout all of Africa by the 1650s. Imported tobacco and tobacco pipes became prized and valuable trading goods and were both quickly absorbed into African cultural traditions, rituals, and politics. The practice spawned a rich artistic tradition of decorated pipes of wood, ceramics, and eventually metal in an endless variety of themes and motifs of all shapes and sizes.

Tobacco and cannabis were used, much like elsewhere in the world, to confirm social relations, but also created entirely new ones. In what is today Congo, a society called Bena Diemba ("People of Cannabis") was organized in the late 19th century in Lubuko ("The Land of Friendship").

The Bena Diemba were collectivist pacifists that rejected alcohol and herbal medicines in favor of cannabis. Certain other herbs have been and still are smoked by certain African communities. Tabwa shamans smoke lubowe (Amaranthus dubius), a plant said to help shamans see invisible spirit sorcerers, even though there are no reports of the substance being hallucinogenic.

Some groups, such as the Fang of Gabon consume eboga (Tabernanthe iboga), a mind-altering drug in religious rituals. In modern Africa, smoking is, in most areas, considered an expression of modernity, and many of the strong adverse opinions that prevail in the West receive less attention.

== Opium ==
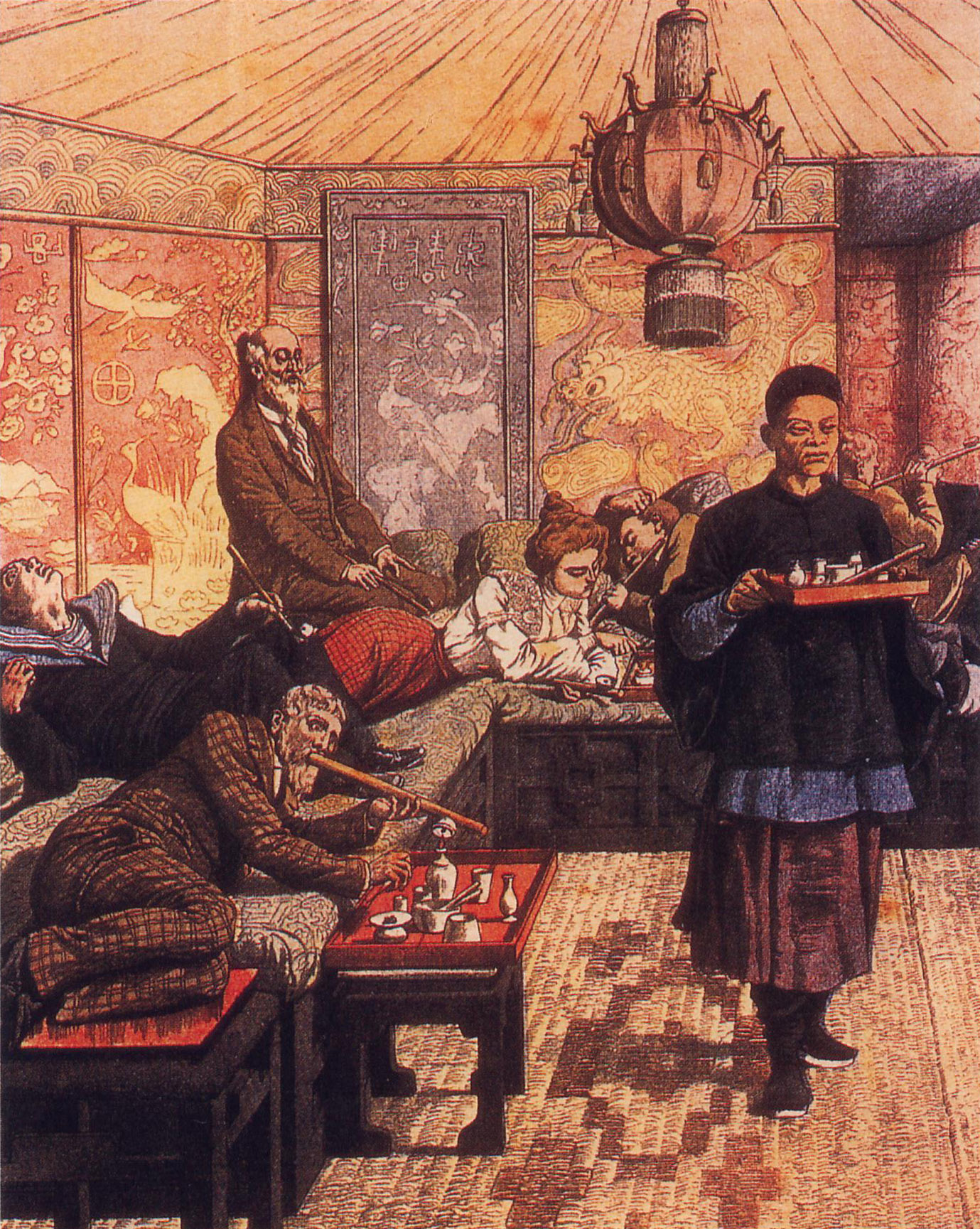
An illustration of an opium den on the cover of Le Petit Journal, July 5, 1903

In the 19th century, the practice of smoking opium became widespread in China. Previously, opium had only been ingested via consumption, and then only for its medicinal properties (opium was an anaesthetic). The narcotic was also outlawed in China sometime in the early 18th century due to the societal issues it caused. Due to a massive trade imbalance, however, foreign merchants started to smuggle opium into China via Canton, to the chagrin of the Chinese authorities. Attempts by Chinese official Lin Zexu to eliminate the trade led to the outbreak of the First Opium War. The Chinese defeat in the First and Second Opium Wars resulted in the legalization of the importation of opium into China.

Opium smoking later spread with Chinese immigrants and led to the establishment of numerous opium dens in China towns around South and Southeast Asia and Western nations. In the latter half of the 19th century, opium smoking became popular in the artistic community in Europe, especially in Paris: artists' neighborhoods such as Montparnasse and Montmartre became virtual opium capitals. While opium dens that catered primarily to emigrant Chinese continued to exist in Chinatowns around the world, the trend among the European artists largely abated after the outbreak of World War I.

== Social stigma ==
=== Early opposition ===
Ever since smoking was introduced outside of the Americas, there has been much vehement opposition to it. Arguments ranged from socio-economic, with tobacco called a usurper of good farmland, to purely moralistic, where many religiously devout individuals saw tobacco as another form of immoral intoxication. Many arguments were presented to the effect that smoking was harmful, and even if the critics were in the end right about many of their claims, the complaints were usually not based on scientific arguments – or if they were, these often relied on humorism and other pre-modern scientific methods.

Dr Eleazar Duncon, 1606, wrote that tobacco "...is so hurtful and dangerous to youth that it might have the pernicious nation expressed in the name, and that it were as well known by the name of Youths-bane as by the name of tobacco".

Early 17th-century descriptive notices of various characteristic types and fashions of men portray tobacconists and smokers as individuals who suffer from false self-images and mistaken illusions about the properties of tobacco taking. Though physicians such as Benjamin Rush claimed tobacco use (including smoking) negatively impacted health as far back as 1798, not until the early 20th century did researchers begin to conduct serious medical studies.

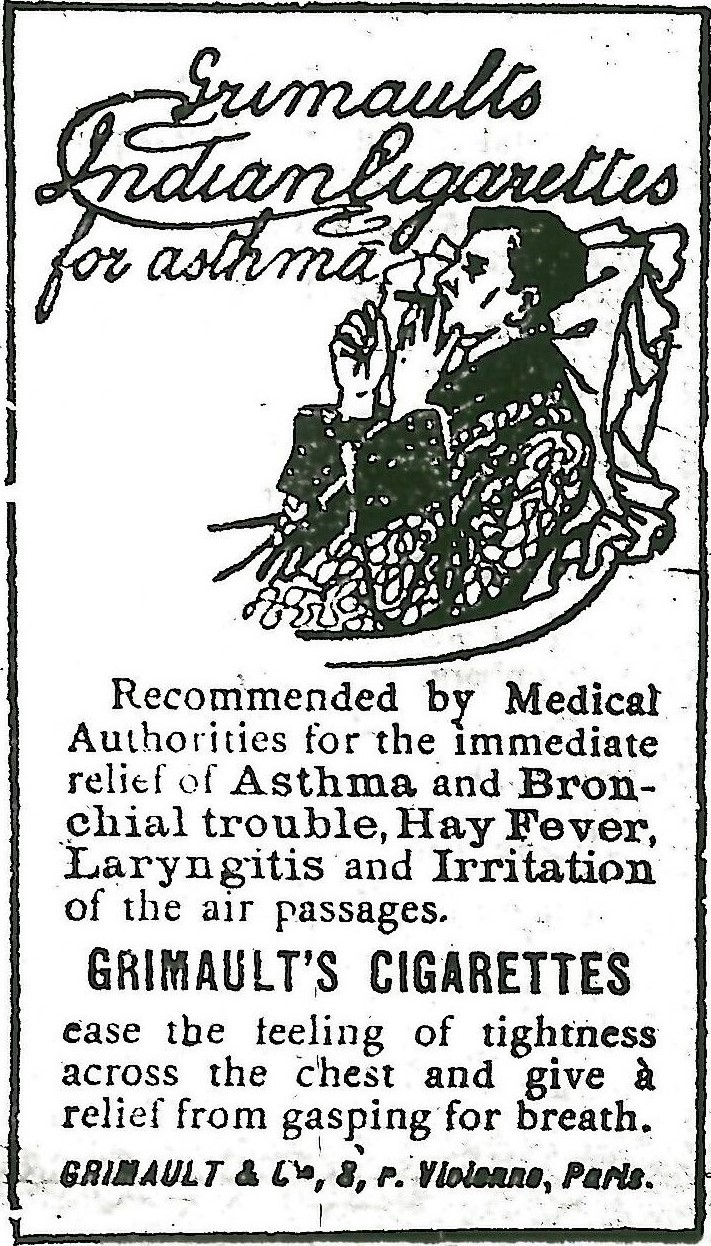
1907 advertisement for Grimault's Indian Cigarettes, emphasising their alleged efficacy for the relief of asthma and other respiratory conditions; these are cannabis cigarettes that contain leaves of belladonna as filler but no tobacco.

=== Regulation of tobacco ===
In the late 19th century, automated cigarette-making machinery was invented. Factories, primarily located in the southern United States, geared up for the mass production of cigarettes at low cost. Cigarettes became elegant and fashionable among society men as the Victorian era gave way to the Edwardian. In 1912, American Dr. Isaac Adler was the first to strongly suggest that lung cancer was related to smoking.

Prior to World War I, lung cancer was a rare disease that most physicians never saw in their careers.

With the postwar rise in cigarette smoking, however, the significant increase in lung cancer promoted nascent investigations into the link between smoking and cancer. In 1929, German scientist Fritz Lickint published a formal statistical description of a lung cancer–tobacco link, based on a study that showed lung cancer sufferers were likely to be smokers. Lickint also argued that tobacco use was the best way to explain the fact that lung cancer struck men four or five times more often than women (since women smoked much less).

In Germany, anti-smoking groups, often associated with anti-liquor groups, first published advocacy against the consumption of tobacco in the journal Der Tabakgegner (The Tobacco Opponent), by the Bohemian organization between 1912 and 1932. The Deutsche Tabakgegner (German Tobacco Opponents) was published in Dresden from 1919 to 1935, and was the second anti-tobacco journal.

After Adolf Hitler rose to power in 1933 he condemned his earlier smoking habit as a waste of money. In later years, Hitler viewed smoking as "decadent" and "the wrath of the Red Man against the White Man, vengeance for having been given hard liquor," lamenting that "...so many excellent men have been lost to tobacco poisoning."

Nazi reproductive policy likewise strengthened the anti-smoking movement. Women who smoked were considered vulnerable to premature aging and loss of physical attractiveness—unsuitable to be wives and mothers in a German family. Werner Huttig of the Nazi Party's Rassenpolitisches Amt (Office of Racial Politics) said that a smoking mother's breast milk contained nicotine, a claim that modern research has verified. Nazi political resistance to smoking, however, did not cross enemy lines.

=== Scientific rationalization ===
A true breakthrough came in 1948, when the British epidemiologist Richard Doll published the first major studies that demonstrated that smoking could cause serious health damage. While some physicians in the United States once pitched cigarettes as health-improving products, some commentators now argue that it is unethical for physicians, as role models, to smoke at all.

In 1950, Richard Doll published research in the British Medical Journal that showed a close link between smoking and lung cancer. Four years later, in 1954 the British Doctors Study, a study of some 40,000 doctors over twenty years, confirmed the suggestion, based on which the UK Government issued advice that smoking and lung cancer rates were related. The British Doctors Study lasted until 2001, with results published every ten years and final results published in 2004 by Doll and Richard Peto. Much early research was also done by Dr. Ochsner. Reader's Digest magazine for many years published frequent anti-smoking articles.

In 1964, the United States Surgeon General's report on Smoking and Health took up the issue, suggesting a link between smoking and cancer. This eventually led to bans on certain advertising, and requirements for health warning labels on tobacco products.

In the 21st century, smoking has become stigmatized throughout Western societies, but it is still a frequent practice among individuals.

A recent development is the rise in popularity of e-cigarettes. In the late 2010s, some health institutions began to praise them for helping people quit smoking. Many studies concluded e-cigarettes are an effective smoking cessation tool, but the long-term side effects of vaping have yet to be discovered. By late 2019, the life-threatening 'vaping associated lung injury' syndrome was described, it is a form of Lipoid pneumonia caused by black market e-liquids containing lipids.

Since the popularisation of e-cigarettes, the tobacco industry protected its interests in a few ways:

- Developing their own smoking cessation tools, later proven to be ineffective and just as harmful as cigarettes.
- Manufacturing their own e-cigarettes.
- Funding studies with the intent of discrediting e-cigarettes.
- Interfering with the FDA

In the United Kingdom, it was estimated in September 2018 that there are now 3,000,000 people who vape, 40% of whom are smokers trying to quit smoking. There is an ongoing debate in the country about whether e-cigarettes should be treated the same under the law, as regular cigarettes would. Amidst the debate, many businesses and institutions have put up signs saying "no vaping" next to their no smoking signs.

== Other substances ==
In the early 1980s, the majority of cocaine shipped to the United States that arrived at Miami came through the Bahamas. However, overproduction of cocaine powder in those islands drove the price down by as much as 80 percent. Confronted with falling profits for their illegal product, drug dealers decided to convert the powder to crack, a solid, smokable form of cocaine, that they could sell in smaller quantities to more people. It was cheap, simple to produce, ready to use, and highly profitable. As early as 1980, reports of crack appeared in Los Angeles, San Diego, Houston, and the Caribbean.

This growth in popularity abated in the late 1990s. Described by criminologist Alfred Blumstein, this change resulted from four factors: tighter gun restrictions in areas where crack cocaine is prevalent, a shrinking market and its institutionalization, the robustness of the economy, and the availability of jobs.
