= 2014 Amsterdam drug deaths =

Deaths of British tourists in the Netherlands

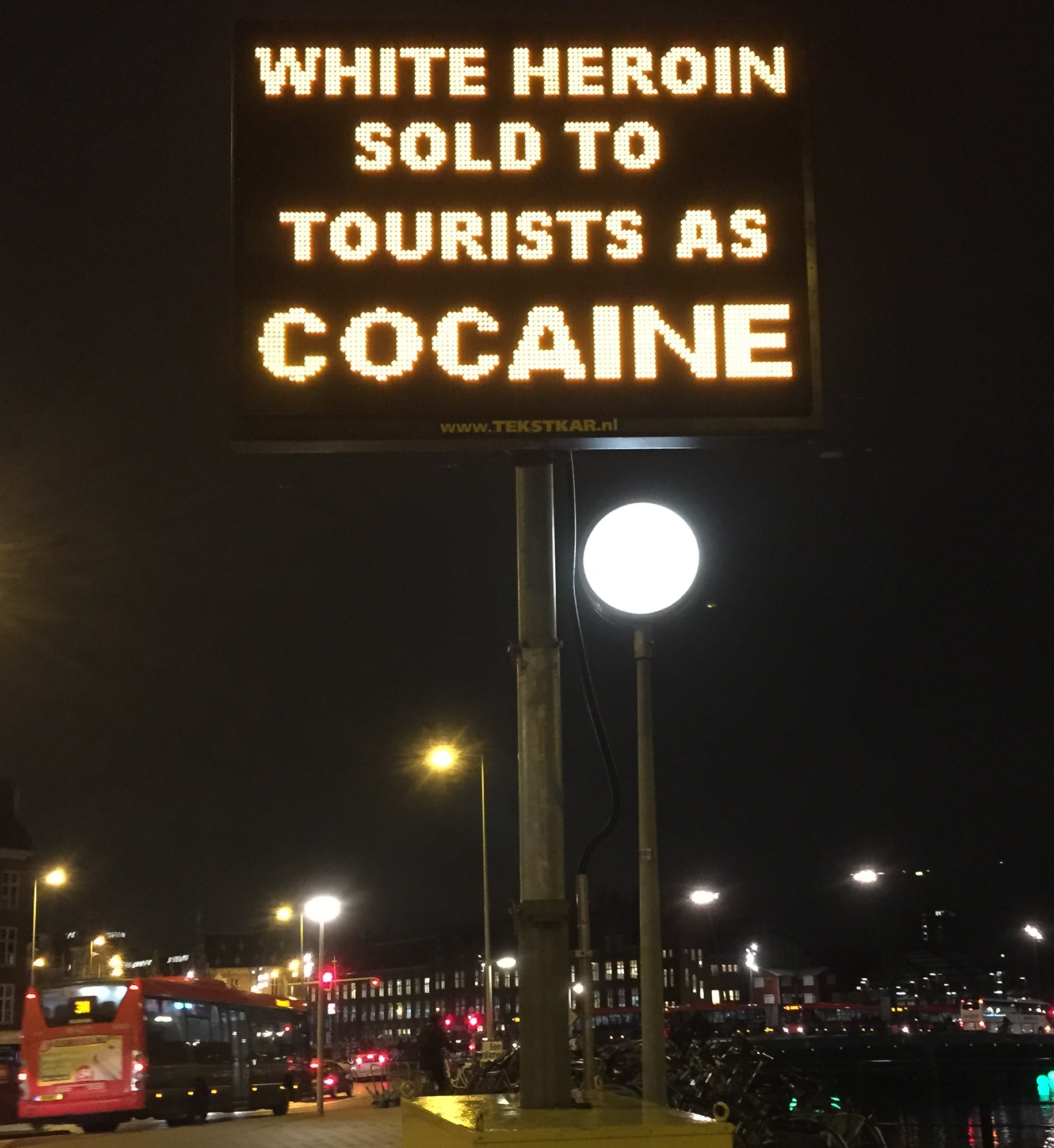
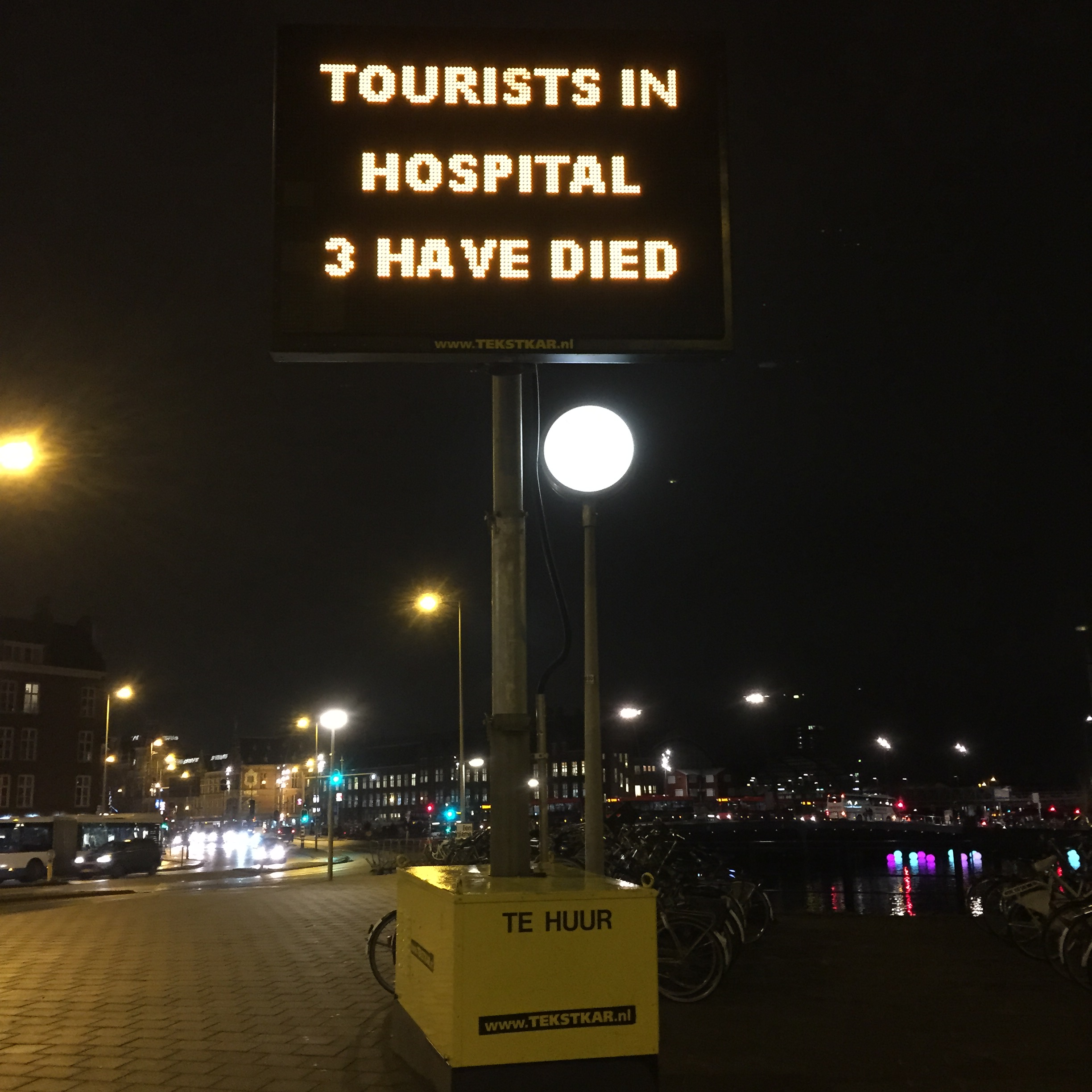
- Warning signs in Amsterdam
- Date: November 2014
- Location: Amsterdam, the Netherlands
- Deaths: 3
- Injuries: 17 (September - November 2014); 3 (February 2015)

On 25 November 2014 two British tourists aged 20 and 21 died in a hotel room in Amsterdam, the Netherlands, after snorting white heroin that was sold as cocaine by a street dealer. The bodies were found less than a month after another British tourist died in similar circumstances. At least 17 other people have had medical treatment after taking the white heroin. Health authorities in Amsterdam warned of the dangerous drugs being sold. Large signs were set up at popular tourist locations in the city. An award of €15,000 was offered for tips about the dealer of the drugs. On 20 January 2015 the last warning signs were removed from the city as there had been no further incidents.

On the night of 25 February 2015, three Danish tourists became unwell after using white heroin, but left the hospital later. The police spread video material of the alleged seller. The warning signs returned in the streets in Amsterdam and flyers and posters were deployed at crucial places in the city. People could also test their drugs at 30 sites in the city.

The man who sold the drugs in February 2015 was Flip S. from Amsterdam. In court there was not enough evidence that he was also the dealer of the drugs causing the other incidents. There was no evidence he sold the drugs to harm people. In February 2016, he was sentenced to one year in prison for dealing drugs and not taking proper precautions like testing his drugs beforehand.

== Aftermath ==
The weekend after the two British men died, a minute's silence was held by thirty-seven amateur football matches in the Novahomes Plymouth and West Devon Combination league in honour of the two. Neither had been named by the Foreign Office following a request from their families. One of their old clubs, Plymouth Falcons, postponed their upcoming match with Plymouth Spurs.

== Controversy ==
Drugs expert Adam Winstock suggested that the drug dealer might have murdered the buyers. The street price of white heroin is three times the price of cocaine, which makes the scenario of a drug dealer, a person driven by the desire of profit, very unlikely to have accidentally substituted heroin for cocaine once, and much less so multiple times for more than two months.

== See also ==
- 2014 in the Netherlands
- Timeline of Amsterdam
- List of deaths from drug overdose and intoxication
