= Smoking in Syria =

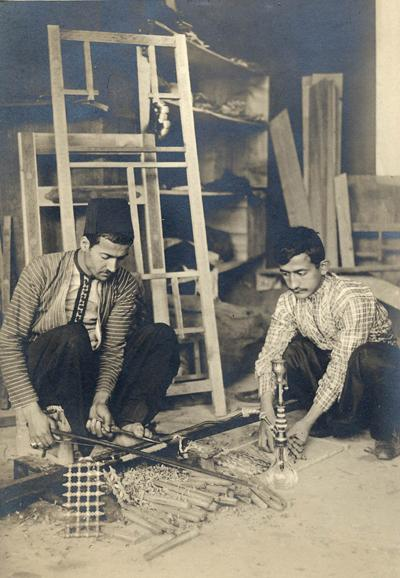
Woodworkers from Damascus, Syria creating wood components for hookah production (19th century)

Smoking in Syria is steadily increasing in popularity amongst the Syrian population, mainly in the forms of cigarettes or narghiles. In Syria, the General Organization of Tobacco manages the growth and exportation of tobacco products. Syrians collectively spend about $600 million per year on tobacco consumption. As of 2010, 20% of women and 60% of men smoke and 98% of the overall population is affected by passive smoking. Narghiles (also known as the hookah or water pipe) and cigarettes are the two main forms of tobacco consumption. Despite the assumption that smoking, specifically the narghile, is embedded in Syrian culture, this phenomenon has only recently become widespread. Health officials are currently working on smoking cessation programs and policies, to remove this idea that smoking in Syria is an essential part of the culture, to educate regarding health effects, and to prevent citizens from smoking in public places.

== Smoking in Syrian culture and history ==
The factual history of smoking in Syria is uncertain. Cannabis was common in the Middle East before the arrival of tobacco, and is known to have existed in at least 2000 BC. Tobacco use in the middle east dates back to the 16th century. Narghile use is likely to have been a longstanding middle eastern tradition but may not have been considered a Syrian staple until the narghile's popularity boom in the 1990s.

Narghile smoking is currently perceived as an important cultural feature of Syria, most notably in the city of Aleppo, while cigarette smoking is perceived as a mundane activity with little importance to cultural life. Despite the perception of Narghile being a staple of Syrian culture, Bisher Daaboul of the Syrian Society for Smoking Cessation notes that Narghiles have only been popular since the 1990s and “are not a tradition here in Syria that we have to live with and we have to protect.”

== Islam and smoking ==
Although Islam has no specific ban on smoking tobacco, several Islamic principles are cited in support of the religion-based banning of tobacco. Depending on the location and community, Islamic authorities have either deemed smoking as Makruh (to be avoided) or Haram (forbidden).

The Fatwa Higher Council of Syria recently reiterated the importance of the 2007 fatwa (Islamic legal pronouncement), issued by Syria's Grand Mufti Ahmad Badruddin Hassoun prohibiting every type of smoking, including cigarettes and narghile, as well as the selling and buying of tobacco and any affiliation with tobacco distribution.

The ruling's justification is based on the view that smoking is a slow way of committing suicide, which is strictly prohibited in the Islamic faith. The connection to suicide is in reaction to the increasing spread of the knowledge of tobacco's detrimental and potentially fatal health effects.

== Appeal of Narghile smoking ==
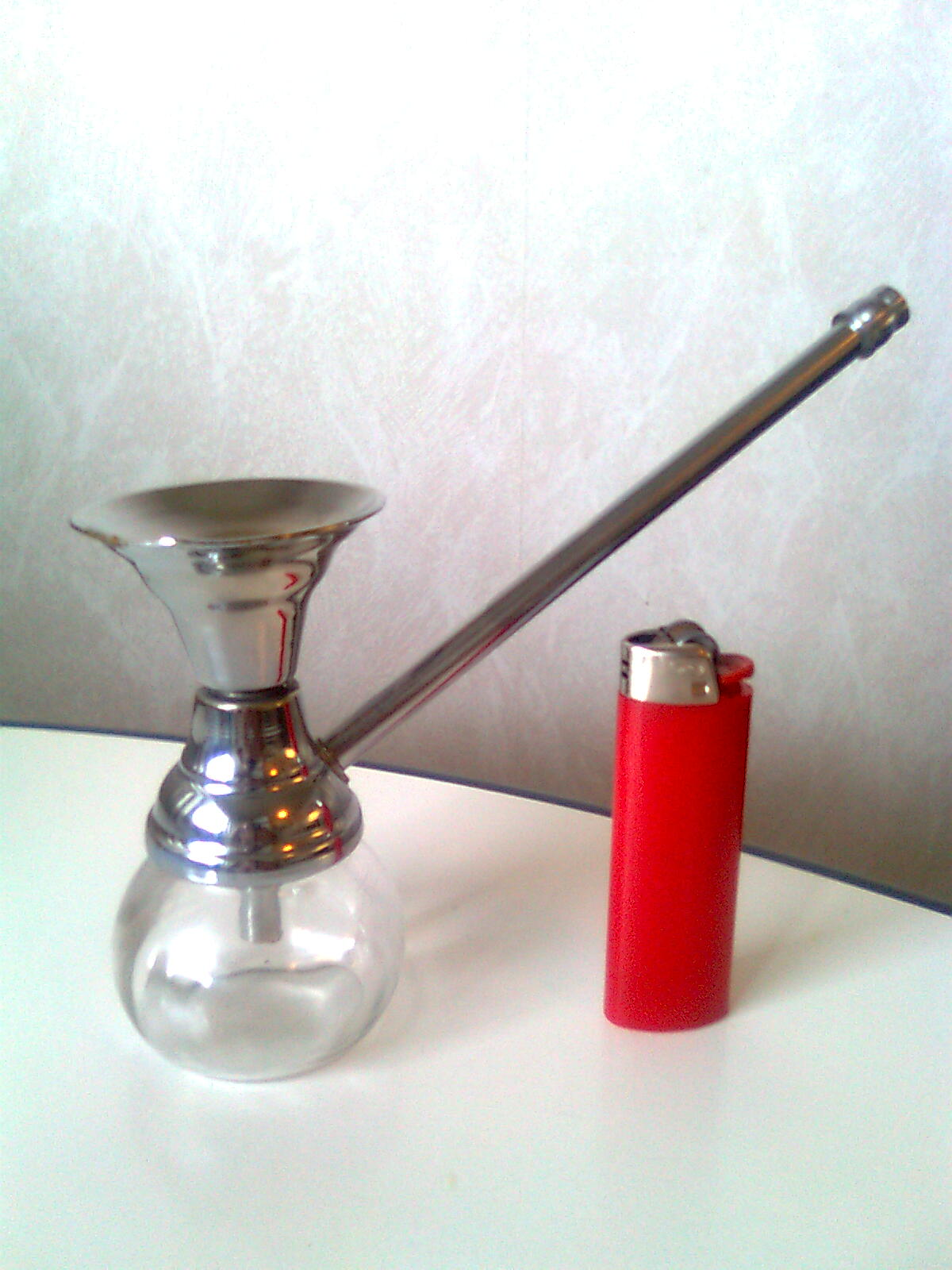
Small argileh from Al-Hamidiyah Souq, Damascus

Narghile smokers generally start smoking in their early 20s as they find that the activity produces a sense of togetherness among friends and facilitates an enjoyable social situation.

The increasing prevalence of tobacco smoke in the form of the Narghile can be attributed to a variety of factors. French anthropologist Kamel Chaoucachi has isolated the three main elements of the narghile's appeal, which include “passing of the smoking hose, conversation of the actors, and the nature of time within the created situation.” These factors highlight the social benefits of smoking the Narghile and the general increase in trendiness of the experience.

Both smokers and non-smokers in Syria acknowledge that smell and taste are noteworthy appealing factors of the narghile. This mention of the narghile's sensory appeal signifies the importance of the introduction of Maasel, a specially prepared fruit-flavored tobacco, in replacement of Ajami, a raw unflavored tobacco, in regard to the growing popularity of the narghile. The spread of Maasel in the 1990s produced a surge in popularity for narghile smoking. In addition to providing the pleasing aroma and taste, Maasel also simplifies the process of narghile preparation in comparison to the more complex process of preparing the traditional Ajami.

Additional contributing factors to the spread of narghile use include free time and boredom of Syrian youth, social pressures, euphoric feeling after inhalation, aesthetic appeal of the narghile itself, smoking as a replacement for alcohol, widespread availability of the narghile in cafes and restaurants, and glamorization and commercialization of the practice in the media.

== Appeal of cigarette smoking ==
Syrian cigarette smokers tend to start smoking in their teens, either in school, amongst family members, or (for males) in military service. Cigarettes are mainly perceived as a means of stress management, coping, relaxation, and improvement in concentration. In contrast to the positive view of smoking the Narghile, Syrian smokers tend to view cigarette smoking as a “mundane, oppressive, personal addiction.”

A main appeal for teenage males is the sense of manliness that is associated with smoking cigarettes, while a main appeal for females of all ages is the associated sense of social liberalization. Other motivations stem from curiosity and general social pressures. Cigarette smokers acknowledge that many of the social pressures that initially prompted them to smoke have long faded but that they continue to smoke because of their addiction.

== Perceptions of addiction ==
Cigarette smokers perceive their habits as a clear addiction. Symptoms including cravings, inability to reduce tobacco consumption, and withdrawal symptoms when attempting to quit.

Although habitual Narghile smokers are less likely than cigarette smokers to perceive their habit as an addiction, many report steadily increasing frequency and intensity of narghile use, difficulty quitting, and withdrawal symptoms when attempting to quit.

Narghile addiction tends to be more context dependent, as many who smoke it only crave it around friends or in the typical Narghile café setting. Cigarette smoking is a more personal pursuit, and desire to smoke is therefore constant regardless of the context.

== Knowledge of health hazards ==
Cigarette smokers generally believe that cigarettes are harmful to their own health and the health of the people around them. Cigarettes smokers are especially cognizant of the effects of second hand smoke on their family members. Narghile smokers are generally less cognizant of the narghile's health effects on themselves and the people around them.

Anthropologists hypothesize that the Syrian public considers narghile smoke to be less dangerous than cigarette smoke due to the perceived “filtration” process that occurs as the tobacco passes through water before it gets inhaled. This hypothesis has become less popular following increasing prevalence of surveying and research, which show that Syrian narghile smokers are aware that water is not a reliable means of filtration. The social atmosphere and positive connotation of smoking the narghile is likely to overshadow the health concerns and make it ultimately seem less harmful than smoking cigarettes.

Although specifics of the health hazards of tobacco use are not widely known, Syrian students tend to generally associate smoking the narghile with an increased risk in respiratory disease while mainly associating smoking cigarettes with an increased risk of cancer.

== Social implications of smoking ==
Despite the prevalence of cigarette smoking in Syrian society, there is still a sense of embarrassment attached to cigarette smoking, most notably in regard to the resulting odor it produces. This lack of social acceptance of cigarette smoking is relatively new and can be viewed as a positive progression within Syrian society.

Narghile smoking, however, is generally socially acceptable. Tensions can sometimes arise between non-smoking parents and smoking children as well as between smokers and non smokers within groups of friends. Narghile smoking can sometimes cause smokers to only spend recreation time with other smokers.

== Trends within groups of the Syrian population ==
=== Sex differences ===
Males in Syria smoke more than females and have a higher daily consumption rate of cigarettes. Among a sampling of Syrian professionals, smoking male schoolteachers and physicians consume about one pack per day whereas smoking female schoolteachers and physicians consume about half a pack per day. Men are more likely to be dependent on nicotine; according to surveys where dependence is measured by what time a cigarette is first smoked in the morning.

=== Women and smoking ===
Women in Syria and across the entire Middle East are becoming increasingly vulnerable to the tobacco epidemic. In the past, Middle Eastern social customs deterred women from smoking tobacco in any form. Narghile smoking, however, is now a more acceptable activity for Syrian women and is seen as an indicator of increased socio-economic liberalization.

Abiding by traditions and cultural norms is a more popular reason for not smoking than that of health related concerns, religion, personal conviction, or economic reasons. The increased prevalence of tobacco use amongst Syrian women can therefore be seen in a positive light as it signifies increasing freedom for women in a generally male-dominated society. However, this development also brings about a new target group for tobacco companies and furthers the potential for the spread of the tobacco epidemic.

Cigarette use by Syrian women is still largely considered to be socially unacceptable.

Non-Arabs, women from urban populations, women from smaller households, and women married to non-relatives are more likely to be smokers of narghile and cigarettes than their counterparts. Christians are more likely to be smokers than Muslims, and women working for pay are more likely to smoke than those that are unemployed. Sign of the tobacco epidemic spreading to women in poorer levels of society are particularly alarming, as this is the most unlikely sector of the population to be affected.

=== Age and smoking habits ===
Male smoking rates increase from 16% in adolescents (up to 18 years of age) to 60% in adults. The age group among educated males with the steepest rise in smoking levels is from 19 to 21 years old.

=== Socio-economic trends ===
Most habitual smokers in Syria are from lower and middle socioeconomic classes. One reason for this general trend is the tendency of Syrians males from lower socioeconomic levels to join the army rather than attend university. In 2002, smoking rates among military recruits were about 46% while the rates of age-matched university students were about 23%. Poorer students and/or those with poorer academic performance are more likely to join the military than to go to university and are thereby more likely to habitually smoke. In this case, those from a less favorable socio-economic background end up more vulnerable to nicotine dependency.

Other cases indicate increased tobacco dependency with heightened levels of financial security. Male physicians in Syria are likely to become nicotine dependent earlier in their careers, whereas female physicians tend to habitually smoke later on in their careers. This trend is likely to be due to delayed financial independence for women.

== Brand preference ==
Smokers in Syria tend to evolve from switching brands in early stages of smoking to sticking with one brand as their dependency increases.

Amongst adult nicotine-dependent smokers, brand selection is closely related to one's socio-economic situation, as foreign brands tend to be double the price of local brands.

90% of smoking high school students smoke foreign brands, as they smoke fewer cigarettes on average than adult habitual smokers. The less frequent amount of smoking amongst high school students makes foreign cigarettes less of a financial burden. Foreign brands are viewed amongst Syrian smokers as lighter, safer, and better tasting, a belief that is derived from advertising strategies rather than the actual characteristics of foreign brands.

== Quitting ==
Cigarette smokers tend to have a strong desire to quit due to health concerns, stigmatization, and concern for the safety of their family members. Quitting attempts are generally followed by relapse.

Short periods of quitting allow smokers to experience the benefits of quitting such as better breathing ability, increased happiness amongst family members, and increased stamina, but subsequent relapses tend to reduce the smoker's confidence in their ability to fully quit, and therefore reduce their motivation to quit despite their experience of the positive effects of quitting.

Relapses tend to be attributed to stressful situations and having friend groups that smoke. Relapses are also caused by cigarette smokers’ use of the narghile as a means of easing off of cigarettes, which ends up proliferating their dependence.

Some cigarette smokers do not have serious intentions to quit and others do not plan to quit at all, but the majority of cigarette smokers have interest in quitting.

About a third of narghile smokers express motivation to quit. Some narghile smokers who are uninterested in quitting express enthusiasm about continuing their smoking habits in the future.

Many cigarette smokers indicate that they are waiting for a health incident to motivate them to quit.

== Potential avenues for tobacco control ==
=== Price increases ===
The method of price increase is likely to have a great impact on tobacco usage, due to the price-sensitivity of most habitual smokers. A World Bank report in 2002 suggested that a 10% additional tobacco tax on local brands would be capable of cutting consumption by 5% and generating a revenue increase of 4.5%.

Price increases on local brands of cigarettes are unlikely to increase illegal smuggling of foreign brands into Syria, as foreign brands are typically only bought by wealthier habitual smokers or irregular smokers. The majority smoking population (low-income habitual smokers) is therefore unlikely to supplement higher priced local brands with smuggled in foreign brands.

=== Smoking cessation programs ===
Smoking cessation programs are essential to those seeking to quit, as medical literature suggests that less than 5% of quitters abstain from cigarettes permanently when quitting without external sources of support.

The majority of health care providers are currently not trained to provide adequate cessation support, so the implementation of training programs is an important step in this method of control.

=== Media campaigns ===
Media campaigns are a viable means of spreading knowledge to the public of the health effects of smoking. This is especially important in relation to narghile smoking, as its positive cultural perception is a large factor in its increasing popularity.

=== Age Restriction for access to tobacco products ===
Age restriction is valuable as many cigarette smokers begin smoking in their teens due to social pressures. Lessening the availability of cigarettes to this age group may decrease chances of the development of a nicotine addiction.

=== Intensive prevention work for women ===
Tradition has been the main barrier keeping women from smoking and this barrier is slowly breaking down. Public health efforts are focusing on replacing the passive barrier of tradition with an active barrier, such as awareness of negative health effects. Negative values of smoking have yet to be dissociated from the positive values of increasing economic and social freedoms for women.

== Obstacles for public health initiatives ==
One of the main obstacles for initiatives to curtail the tobacco epidemic in Syria is the shortage of reliable standardized data on tobacco use in Syrian society. The first published initiative to study the epidemiology of smoking in Syria began in 1998.

Another primary issue involves the Syrian medical industry and its health care providers. According to a sampling of Aleppo health care professionals in 2010, 22.4% of physicians and 26% of nurses smoke cigarettes and 9.5% of physicians and 9.4% of nurses smoke the narghile. Health care providers who smoke are less likely to believe that smoking is harmful and acknowledge the specific health impacts of smoking than those who do not smoke.

Only half of physicians included in the 2010 study routinely inquire about their patient's smoking habits, and of those, only 47.7% of those assist patients in quitting and only 11.6% encourage the scheduling of follow-up appointments for continued assistance. Only 5.3% of physicians reported to have prescribed medicine to aid in smoking cessation.

Physicians note that the main obstacles for public health initiatives include lack of motivation amongst patients, lack of time, scarcity of medication, and lack of experience. Health care providers who smoke are also generally less motivated to promote cessation efforts due to their own smoking habits.

== Syrian organizations for smoking cessation ==
Two notable organizations are the Syrian Society for Smoking Cessation and the Syrian Center for Tobacco studies, both of which are affiliated with the World Health Organization.

The Syrian Society for Smoking Cessation is “a local association in Syria that was established on 22/02/2006 to support WHO and MOH efforts to control this huge problem. The main goal of this association is to increase the awareness among the Syrian society about the damages caused by smoking and also to prevent smoking spreading especially among the youths.”

The Syrian Center for Tobacco Studies is “a pioneer model of international cooperation for the establishment of sustainable research base in a developing country setting. It addresses the need to create local expertise not only in research methodology, but also in research support and fund raising areas.” Its main goals are to study Syrian smoking practices qualitatively and quantitatively, to develop culturally appropriate and cost effective intervention techniques, and to train Syrian tobacco researchers in order to monitor the efforts to curtail the epidemic properly. One of its main strategies is multidisciplinary research, involving the efforts of medical anthropologists, psychologists, epidemiologists, behavioral pharmacologists, and physicians.

== Bans on smoking ==
Smoking in Syria is currently banned inside cafes (hookah bars), restaurants and other public spaces by a presidential decree issued on 12 October 2009 which went into effect on 21 April 2010. Syria was the first Arab country to introduce such a ban. The decree also outlaws smoking in educational institutions, health centres, sports halls, cinemas and theatres and on public transport. The restrictions include the narghile. According to the official Syrian Arab News Agency, fines for violating the ban range from LS 500 to LS 100,000 (US$11 to US$2,169).

A decree in 1996 banned tobacco advertising, while a 2006 law outlawed smoking on public transport and in some public places, introducing fines for offenders. People under the age of 18 are not allowed to buy tobacco in Syria.

== Public opinion of bans ==
The 2010 ban has produced a variety of negative responses as it is said to “collide with Syria's water-pipe culture.”

Businesses say the ban is already hurting trade, and has, “led to a total halt in business” Although citizens know that this is the government's attempt to tries improve the nation's health, changing the tobacco loving culture in this region as well as the dependence on tobacco consumption for business may take some time. As of 2010, 20% of women and 60% of men are said to smoke and 98% of the overall population is affected by passive smoking., Narghile (also known as the hookah or water pipe) and cigarettes are the two main forms of tobacco consumption.

Shop owners are trying to find ways around the law, such as allowing customers to smoke in the back or opening all doors and windows to have their restaurant be considered an outdoor establishment in which smoking would be allowed. They still take much caution, however, as they can be subject to fines and have the additional risk of the complete shutdown of their business following multiple offenses. Smoking customers themselves are subject to fines up to around $44.

Some businesses are beginning to accept the new law and try out other means of luring customers such as live music, cheaper prices, and better food. The “narghile boom” that had taken place over the course of the 15 years preceding the ban is believed to be at an end.

Despite the successful cut-down on public smoking, the ban has also caused an increase in narghile delivery and at-home smoking, since this type of smoking is not prohibited by the ban.

Health Minister Rida Said defended the ban saying it “protects the rights of non-smokers, many of whom are children, and is an important step towards reduction of smoking-related illness”.

Syria's revolutionary youth organization (affiliated with the ruling Ba’ath party) held a rally in Damascus to promote the new law, as a means of bringing about a “healthy and strong population”.

== Smoking and the Syrian protests of 2011 ==
Cigarette smoke plays a large role in the characterization of Syrian protesters. “Syria’s disenfranchised Bouazizis are the greatest population of this revolution. Incidentally, a lot of them are also four-pack-a-day smokers.” Prominent activist bloggers advertise their smoking habits. A young Bouazizi from the city of Binnish said in July 2011, “I was lost for 12 hours in the mountains. Never mind that I had no food or water — my agony was, I had no cigarettes!”

The association with smoking and social liberalization for women has made smoking popular and present in the image of the female Syrian protester.

In some territories controlled by the Syrian opposition and/or ISIS smoking is banned and even punishable with death.

== See also ==
- History of smoking
- Tobacco fatwa
- Religious views on smoking
