= Hookah lounge =

Establishment where patrons share hookah/shisha

A hookah lounge (also called a shisha bar or den, especially in Britain and parts of Canada, or a hookah bar) is an establishment where patrons share shisha (flavoured tobacco) from a communal hookah or from one placed at each table or a bar.

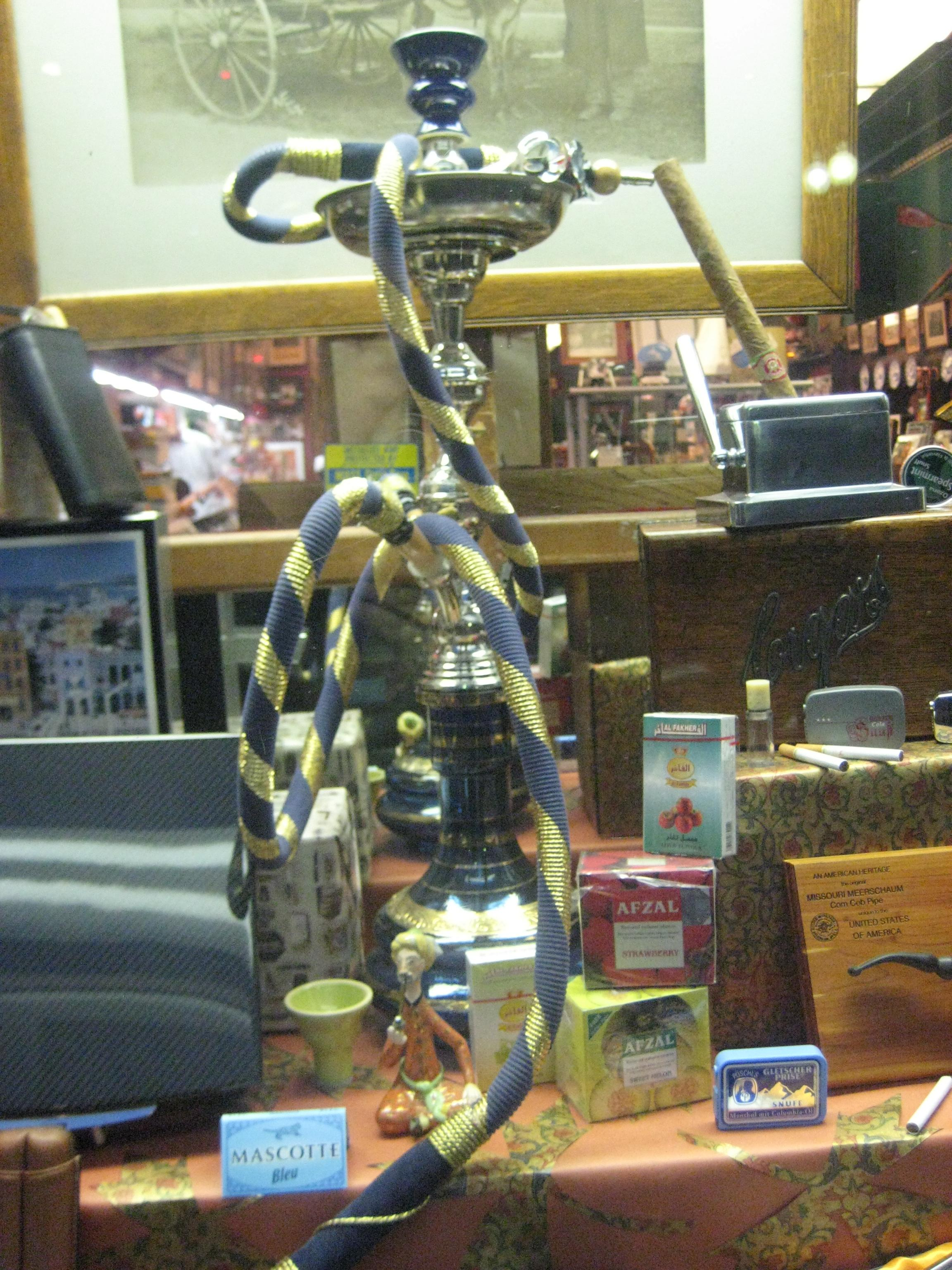
A hookah and a variety of tobacco products are on display in a Harvard Square store window in Cambridge, Massachusetts, United States.

In Western countries, shisha parlors are often owned and operated by people from the Arab world or the Indian subcontinent where use of the hookah is a centuries-old tradition. Many shisha parlors incorporate such elements as Islamic decor and Arabic music or Indian Islamic music and have traditional decor, but some are simply bars without the eastern cultural elements.

== Characteristics ==
In the United States and Europe, shisha parlors are most popular in college towns and urban areas and are regarded by enthusiasts as a novel and chic way to socialize. Certain parlors offer modern hookahs with fruit bowls or other kinds of improvements over smoking hookah at home. Some people of Middle Eastern or South Asian extraction consider them a continuation of their own cultural traditions. However, shisha parlors nowadays often distance themselves from the eastern cultures by offering hookah and alcohol without the cultural elements. These bars differ from other bars only in the fact that they offer hookah.

Usually a disposable mouthpiece is provided for each user for hygienic reasons. When alcohol is not sold, shisha parlors derive revenue from sales of coffee, tea, soft drinks and snack foods.

Some shisha parlors have well-equipped kitchens and are more akin to bistros. In the broadest sense, any restaurant or nightclub can be considered a shisha parlor or club if it offers patrons hookahs, shisha and a comfortable place to smoke. Some offer Middle Eastern cuisine menu items.

In the United States, due to several state tobacco control laws, many shisha bars have made the transition from offering tobacco shisha to herbal shisha, which is tobacco-free and can legally be smoked indoors in areas that have restrictions on tobacco smoking. Although herbal shisha does not contain tobacco or nicotine, when burned it does produce harmful chemicals, including heavy metals and polycyclic aromatic hydrocarbons, which can cause cancer and heart disease. These harmful chemicals are breathed in both by smokers and bystanders.

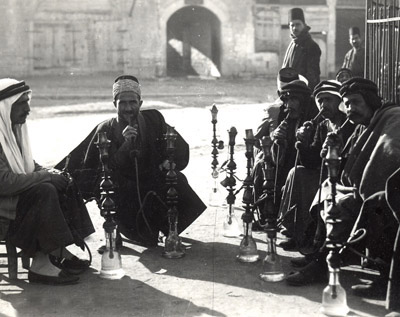
Waterpipes outside a café in Aleppo, Syria.

== History ==
The origins of hookah are controversial, even though most agree that it started either in ancient Persia or the Indian subcontinent.

== In Europe ==
Hookah smoking is common in many European and other countries including:

- Germany – Hookahs are available in many establishments in Germany, particularly in Berlin, Cologne and the Ruhr Area and areas, and it is not only popular amongst Turkish people. The German customs authority recorded a growing trade with illegal and untaxed shisha tobacco in 2017. While previously shisha was smuggled via ports in Rotterdam and Hamburg, a trend was noted where the tobacco was produced in hidden factories in Germany according to René Matschke, the chief of customs in Hamburg.
- Netherlands – Hookahs are now gaining popularity in the Netherlands, particularly in Rotterdam and Amsterdam.
- United Kingdom – In the United Kingdom, hookahs are most commonly found in "shisha bars" run by Lebanese, Pakistani or Egyptian people. Since a 2007 British ban on smoking in public places, Shisha bars have risen from 179 in 2007 to 556 in 2012.
- Spain – Hookah use has grown in popularity in Spain, especially among the young. As a result, many teterías (tea houses) have made hookahs available to patrons.
- Russia – Due to heavy influence from South Caucasus and Central Asia, hookahs have become a widespread recreational practice in large Russian cities, and are now offered in many cafes and restaurants.
- Denmark – Shisha bars have gained popularity in recent years. Shisha Parlors are present in Aarhus, Odense, and Copenhagen and other cities.
- Czechia – In the Czech Republic, the concept of shisha bars is quite new, but some can be found in big cities, such as Prague or Brno. Tea rooms, where you can order tea or shishas are more common throughout the country, such as in bigger cities, especially ones with universities. There are more than 50 tea rooms in Prague - during their peak before the pandemic, there were more than 100.

== In the United States ==
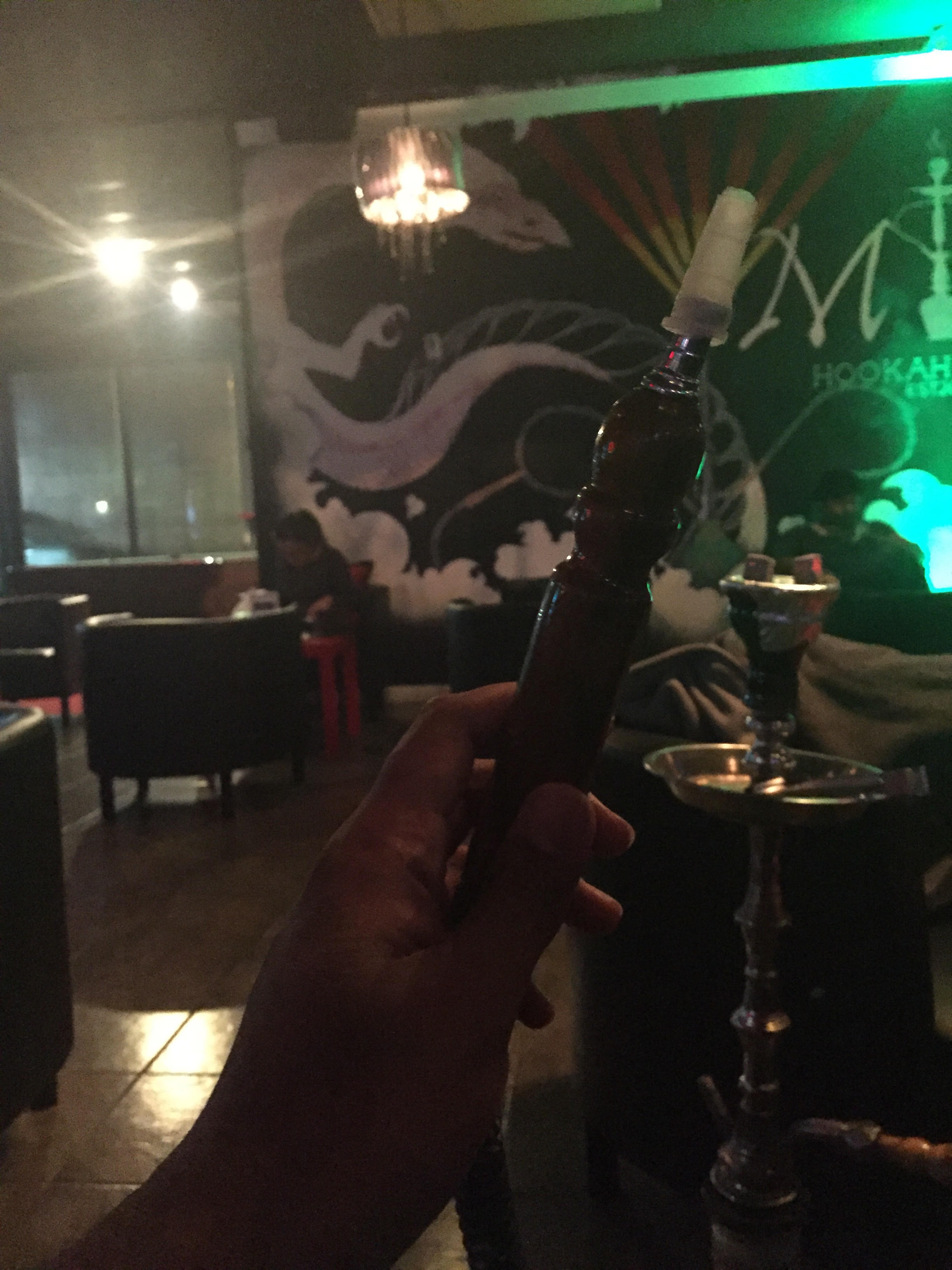
Mist Hookah Lounge in North Brunswick, New Jersey

In the United States, establishments akin to shisha parlors first opened decades ago in the immigrant quarters of New York City, Chicago, and Los Angeles, California as coffee and tea houses. According to Stanford Research into the Impact of Tobacco Advertising, hookah lounges have operated in the United States since at least the 1960s, with the first dedicated hookah lounge reported in Las Vegas.

Many shisha parlors in the United States have elements such as glass tables, plasma televisions, and oxygen bars. Most bars in the U.S. require patrons to be at least 21 years old to smoke shisha and 21 years old to purchase (exceptions are Utah, Alabama, and New Jersey: 19 years old to smoke).

Over the recent years hookah has become increasingly popular for teens and young adults. As of 2014, one out of every five high school seniors in the U.S. had tried hookah, and one in five 18-to-24-year-olds in the U.S. have smoked hookah in the past month. It is not uncommon now to find hookah bars within short distance of college campuses and in the surrounding towns. The same source reports that hookah lounges now operate in more than two-thirds of U.S. states and are generally concentrated in urban areas and near colleges and universities. This younger generation is often the target for hookah business establishments.

Laws about selling and use of hookah in the U.S. differ state by state. Most states do not allow minors (under age 18) to smoke hookah and some states ban hookah smoking in public places. Recently, the U.S. Food and Drug Administration (FDA) has begun to regulate hookah tobacco along with cigarettes and other types of tobacco. There is concern that even if FDA places health warning labels on hookah packages, they may not be seen by people who smoke in hookah lounges, since the tobacco is usually taken out of the packages before it is served.

== In Asia ==
- Iran has a long history of hookah (qalyān (Persian: قلیان)) use. The use of hookahs in bars, cafes and lounges has reportedly seen a resurgence in recent years.
- Vietnam: Shisha appeared in Vietnam in 2009. This is a very popular trend in Vietnam until now. It is rated as safe and not as dangerous as cigarettes so the number of users increases greatly. At first, shisha was mainly used in Hanoi and Ho Chi Minh City, and now the number of shisha users has appeared in the whole territory of Vietnam.

== Smoking bans and exemptions ==
Because of the harm of passive smoking, many municipalities, especially in North America and Europe have enacted smoking bans in public places. Sometimes, however, businesses can obtain special permits allowing smoking within; these permits are typically available only for shisha bars, cigar bars, tobacconists, and similar establishments where smoking is the focus of activity. They are less frequently available for places in which alcohol or food is served.

In some cases, the ban is against tobacco smoking specifically. When this is the case, a shisha bar may remain in business by replacing traditional, tobacco-based shisha with a tobacco-free mu‘assel.

In order to remain open, many shisha bars cannot sell food or beverages. Approximately 90% of the cities that have put a ban on smoking in public places have exemptions for shisha bars. The cities with these kinds of exemptions, typically, have more dense populations.

Analyses compiled by the World Health Organization Framework Convention on Tobacco Control Knowledge Hub and U.S. policy reviews note that, although many jurisdictions have comprehensive smoke-free air laws, numerous cities and states allow exemptions that permit hookah bars to continue operating despite bans on cigarette smoking in indoor public places. These exemptions have been described as a public health concern because they maintain secondhand exposure to waterpipe smoke in otherwise smoke-free settings.

== Health concerns ==
Hookah bars are a growing public health concern. Many hookah users do not understand the health risks that come along with the practice. Common incorrect beliefs include that shisha is not addictive and that the smoke contains fewer toxic chemicals and carcinogens. However, hookah smoke contains many of the same toxic chemicals found in cigarettes and it has not been shown to be safer. The tobacco contains nicotine and is addictive. The World Health Organization reports that, based on available evidence, waterpipe tobacco smoking carries health risks comparable to those of cigarette smoking. It also notes that access to waterpipe use has expanded globally, particularly through cafés and lounges that are frequented by teenagers and young adults. The water does not filter out the carcinogens or other harmful chemicals are not filtered out. Hookah users breathe in many harmful chemicals, such as carbon monoxide, nicotine, polycyclic aromatic hydrocarbons, and aldehydes. Like cigarettes, breathing in these chemicals cause many health problems, such as cancer, heart disease, lung disease, periodontal disease, and low birth weight in babies whose mothers smoke it. It has been shown that waterpipe tobacco contains 27 known or suspected carcinogens, as well as significant concentrations of toxicants thought to cause addiction, heart disease and lung disease. Traditional charcoal-heated hookahs deliver nine to ten times more carbon monoxide than do standard cigarettes. There have been multiple published reports of acute carbon monoxide poisoning caused by narghile (waterpipe tobacco/hookah). Hookah smokers sometimes take in so much carbon monoxide, an odorless, poisonous gas, that they develop carbon monoxide poisoning. Carbon monoxide poisoning causes dizziness, nausea and vomiting, irritability, rapid fall in blood pressure, and chest pain, and often must be treated in hospital emergency departments. This is sometimes known as "hookah sickness". Hookah smoking can also be harmful to non-smokers since hookah releases many harmful substances (including particulate matter, nicotine, and carbon monoxide) in the air that are breathed in by anyone in the area.

Public health studies measuring indoor air quality in hookah lounges in the United States and other countries have reported elevated concentrations of carbon monoxide and fine particulate matter, with air quality in many venues classified as “unhealthy” or “hazardous” under U.S. Environmental Protection Agency standards. The authors concluded that poorly ventilated hookah lounges can expose employees and patrons to potentially harmful levels of indoor air pollution.

Due to the health concerns, many cities seek to create tougher restrictions for shisha bars, and some want them shut down altogether.
