= Islamic views on smoking =

The Islamic views on smoking vary by region. Though smoking or tobacco in general is not explicitly mentioned in the Quran or hadith, contemporary scholars have condemned it as completely harmful, and have at times prohibited smoking outright (declared it haram) as a result of the severe health effects that it causes. A tobacco fatwa is a fatwa (Islamic legal pronouncement) that prohibits the usage of tobacco by Muslims. Arab Muslims tend to prohibit smoking and, in South Asia, smoking tends to be considered lawful but discouraged.

For many Muslims, the legal status of smoking has changed during recent years, and numerous fatwas, including from notable authorities such as Al-Azhar University in Cairo, now consider smoking haram (prohibited). The reasons cited in support of the reclassification of smoking as prohibited include Islamic law's general prohibition of all actions that result in harm. For example, the Quran says, "And spend of your substance in the cause of God, and make not your own hands contribute to your own destruction." Additionally, jurists rely on the exhortations in the Quran not to waste money. Greater appreciation of the risks associated with secondhand smoke has also led recent jurists to cite the obligation to avoid causing willful annoyance, distress, or harm to other people.

Fatwas condemning smoking have been issued in Egypt, Indonesia, Kuwait, Malaysia, Morocco, Oman, Qatar, Pakistan, the Philippines, Saudi Arabia, and the UAE, among others.

Malcolm X said in his autobiography that "the smoking evil wasn't invented in Prophet Muhammad's days—if it had been, I believe he would have banned it."

== History ==
The earliest fatwa regarding smoking was issued in Morocco in 1602. Following the introduction of tobacco to the kingdom in 1598, King Ahmad al-Mansur sought guidance from religious scholars in Fez. The kingdom's Grand Mufti and the Wali of Sila both ruled that smoking was forbidden in Islam. This ruling failed to have much effect on tobacco use in the kingdom, leading the Mufti to issue a second ruling forbidding its use, as the use of all "intoxicants and harmful substances" is forbidden in Islam. This categorical prohibition was unsuccessful, and the Mufti and the other scholars who joined him in his ruling were either killed by a mob angry at this ruling or fled the country.

In recent years, tobacco fatwas (Islamic legal pronouncements) have been issued due to health concerns.

The Qur'ān, does not specifically prohibit or denounce smoking, but gives behavioral guidance:

- “Don't throw yourself into danger by your own hands...” (Al Baqarah 2:195)
- “You may eat, drink, but not waste” (Al-A‘râf 7:31)
- "Do not kill yourselves for God Almighty is most merciful to you" (An-Nisa 4:29)

Surveys and studies have produced conflicting results on tobacco use among Muslims. A 2002 survey in Pakistan found that observant Muslims tend to avoid smoking. A 2003 study of young Muslim Arab-Americans found that Islamic influences were correlated with some diminished smoking. Conversely, an Egyptian study from 2003 found that knowledge of an anti-smoking fatwa did not reduce smoking. Data from the World Health Organization found the prevalence of smoking was increasing overall in majority Islamic countries as of 2000.

The prominent scholar Yusuf al Qaradawi argues that smoking is no longer an issue of dispute among Islamic scholars due to the knowledge of health risks:

The reported juristic disagreement among Muslim scholars on the ruling concerning smoking, since its appearance and spread, is not usually based on differences between legal proofs, but on the difference in the verification of the cause on which the ruling is based. They all agree that whatever is proved to be harmful to the body and mind is prohibited, yet they differ whether this ruling applies to smoking. Some of them claimed that smoking has some benefits, others assured that it had few disadvantages compared to its benefits, whereas a third group maintained that it had neither benefits nor bad effects. This means that if scholars had been certain about the harmfulness of smoking, then they would undoubtedly have considered it prohibited.[…]

Second: Our inclination to consider smoking prohibited does not mean that it is as grave as major sins like adultery, drinking alcohol or theft. In fact, prohibited matters in Islam are relative; some of them are minor prohibitions whereas others are major, and each has its own ruling. The major sins, for example, have no expiation other than sincere repentance. However, the minor sins can be expiated by the Five Prayers, the Friday Prayer, the Fasting of Ramadan, the Night Vigil Prayer in Ramadan, and other acts of worship. They can also be expiated by avoiding the major sins.

Fatwas ruling that smoking is impermissible have been issued by sheikhs of all four Sunni schools of fiqh—Hanafi, Maliki, Shafi'i, and Hanbali—as well as by those of the Ibadi sect.

== By country ==
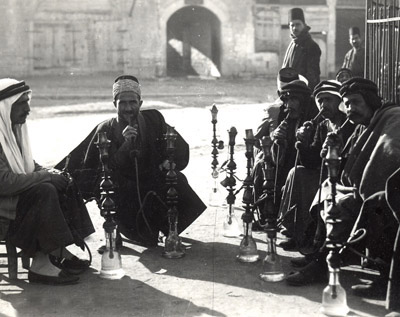
Waterpipes outside a café in Aleppo, Syria

=== Egypt ===
In 2000, the Grand Mufti of Egypt, Dr. Nasr Farid Wasil, ruled that smoking was haram (forbidden) in Islam because of its detrimental health effects. The fatwa, which ruled that smoking is a major sin on par with alcohol use and acceptable grounds for divorce, triggered substantial controversy in Egypt. Grand Imam Gadul Haq Ali Gadul Haq, the Sheikh of al-Azhar mosque, the center of Islamic learning in the Sunni world, issued a similar ruling in 2000, citing the following verse from the Quran as justification: "and cast not yourselves to ruin with your own hands".

=== Indonesia ===
In 2009, Indonesian Ulema Council (MUI), the organization of Indonesian religious scholars, declared smoking in public or near pregnant women haram (forbidden), while declaring smoking in general to be makruh (discouraged or reprehensible). Indonesian Muslim organization Muhammadiyah declared smoking haram in 2010; the organization had previously listed smoking as merely makruh. Tobacco companies sponsored 1,350 youth-oriented events from January to October in 2007, and often gave free cigarettes to youths. A 2015 study found that the fatwa had had a small effect on smoking and was primarily effective at keeping non-smokers from smoking.

=== Iran ===
Iran's Grand Ayatollah Mirza Shirazi in 1891 issued a fatwa against tobacco. The fatwa was not based on the health effects of tobacco but framed as an Islamic duty to resist the grant of a tobacco monopoly to a foreign company by the Shah of Iran.

=== Malaysia ===
Malaysia's National Fatwa Council first issued a fatwa against smoking in 1996, when it declared smoking haram because of its detrimental health effects. In 2013, a study of Muslims and Buddhists in Malaysia found that this fatwa and other religious norms against smoking have had an independent and significant increase in quit attempts. Among Muslims, religious pressure against smoking was more effective at inspiring people to quit than social pressure. In 2015, the National Fatwa Council followed-up by issuing a fatwa declaring electronic cigarettes haram because of their harmful health effects and bad smell.

=== Oman ===
In 1996, Sheikh Ahmed Bin Hamad Al Khalili, the Grand Mufti of Oman, issued a fatwa prohibiting smoking and the sale of tobacco, comparing smoking to "sipping poison" Sheikh Al Khalili cited a verse from the Quran, "do not kill yourselves for God Almighty is most merciful to you," to justify his ruling.

=== Philippines ===
The Supreme Council of Darul Ifta of the Philippines, headed by Grand Mufti Sheikh Omar Pasigan, stated in June 2010 that smoking cigarettes is haram.

=== Saudi Arabia ===
The Grand Mufti of Saudi Arabia, Sheikh Muhammad ibn Ibrahim Aal Al-Sheikh, has ruled that "smoking is impermissible on the basis of authentic quotations, sound judgments, and the opinions of reputable physicians." The Mufti cites a sahih hadith (verifiable saying of the Prophet) saying "do not harm yourself or others." He further referenced a Quranic verse saying that the Prophet "forbids that which is unwholesome."

=== United Arab Emirates ===
In addition to issuing a fatwa against smoking, the United Arab Emirates instructed imams in all mosques to read a sermon against smoking on June 11, 1999, following Friday prayers.

== Tobacco industry pushback ==
From the 1970s to the late 1990s, tobacco companies including British American Tobacco and Phillip Morris were involved in campaigns to undermine fatwas against smoking in Muslim majority countries by branding any Muslim who opposed smoking as "'a fundamentalist' who wished to return to sharia law", and to be "a threat to existing government". Several firms in the tobacco industry were also concerned about the World Health Organization's encouraging an anti-smoking stance by Muslim scholars. A 1985 report from tobacco firm Philip Morris squarely blamed the WHO: "This ideological development has become a threat to our business because of the interference of the WHO ... The WHO has not only joined forces with Muslim fundamentalists who view smoking as evil, but has gone yet further by encouraging religious leaders previously not active anti-smokers to take up the cause."

== See also ==
- Tobacco Protest
- Religious views on smoking
- Smoking in Syria
- Makruh
- Haram
- Fasad
- Nicotine
- Caffeine
