= Religious views on smoking =

Religious views on smoking vary widely. Indigenous peoples of the Americas have traditionally used tobacco for religious purposes, while Abrahamic and other religions have only been introduced to the practice in recent times due to the European colonization of the Americas in the 16th century.

== Abrahamic religions ==
Except for a few Christian denominations, the Abrahamic religions originated before tobacco smoking was introduced to the Old World from the New World. Therefore, these religions do not address it in their foundational teachings; however, modern practitioners have offered interpretations of their faith about smoking.

=== Christianity ===
In the 19th century, smoking was considered inappropriate by certain Christians. In the autumn of 1874, George Frederick Pentecost got into the so-called Daily Telegraph scandal: a smoking controversy, over which his counterpart Charles Spurgeon, known as the 'prince of preachers', was exploited by the tobacco industry. Tobacco was listed, along with drunkenness, gambling, cards, dancing and theatre-going, in J.M. Judy's Questionable Amusements and Worthy Substitutes, a book featuring anti-smoking dialogue which was published in 1904 by the Western Methodist Book of Concern. However, Johann Sebastian Bach was known to enjoy smoking a pipe, and wrote poetry on how doing so enhanced his relationship with God.

==== Roman Catholic Church ====
The Roman Catholic Church does not condemn smoking per se, but rather encourages the faithful to use the goods of the Earth in temperance and moderation, avoiding any excesses. As described in the Catechism (CCC 2290):

The virtue of temperance disposes us to avoid every kind of excess: the abuse of food, alcohol, tobacco, or medicine.

The famous Catholic writer G.K. Chesterton is also famous for saying: “in Catholicism the pipe, the pint, and the cross can all fit together.”

==== Orthodoxy ====
Though there is no official canonical prohibition regarding the use of tobacco, the more traditional among the Eastern Orthodox Churches forbid their clergy or monastics to smoke, and the laity are strongly encouraged to give up this habit, if they are subject to it. One who smokes is considered to be polluting the "Temple of the Holy Spirit" (i.e., the body), which has been sanctified by the reception of the Sacred Mysteries (Sacraments). In Orthodox cultures, various derogatory terms have developed to describe smoking, such as "incense of Satan". Father Alexander Lebedeff described the Orthodox approach as follows:

You ask, "Are there canons that speak to the issues of ... tobacco?" I would ask you, where are the Canons that forbid use of marijuana or snorting cocaine or downloading pornography from the Internet? Obviously, there are none. Does this mean that your innate Orthodox common sense should not be enough to guide you to recognize what is healthy and what is not? The Canons should not be considered a compendium of answers to all possible questions. God gave us a mind and a conscience and we should use them to determine what is right and what is wrong, whether or not the particular yes issue has been addressed in the canons or not.
Smoking tobacco is a disgusting, filthy, addictive habit that turns the mouth of the smoker into an ashtray. It not only poisons the body of the smoker but pollutes the air that others around the smoker breathe. It is absolutely incompatible with the dignity of the Orthodox Priesthood, diaconate, or monastic state, whether the Canons specifically address it or not.

==== Other churches ====
The view of the body being the "temple of the Holy Spirit" is also common in Protestant circles, and is quoted as a basis against not only tobacco use, but recreational drugs, eating disorders, sexual immorality, and other vices which can be harmful to the body. The Bible reference is I Corinthians 6:7-20.

Methodist churches recommend abstinence from the use of tobacco, reflecting their support of the temperance movement.

Jehovah's Witnesses have not permitted any active members to smoke since 1973.

The Seventh-day Adventist Church also recommends that its members abstain from tobacco use. It has called for governments to enact policies that include "a uniform ban on all tobacco advertising, stricter laws prohibiting smoking in non-residential public places, more aggressive and systematic public education, and substantially higher taxes on cigarettes." North American Adventist health study recruitments from 2001 to 2007 found that 98.9% of Adventists were non-smokers.

In the Church of Jesus Christ of Latter-day Saints, the use of tobacco is against the Word of Wisdom, the church's health code adherence to which is necessary for baptism and full participation in all church activities such as entry into the church's temples, service in full-time missionary work, and attendance at church schools. However, violation of the Word of Wisdom is not normally grounds for withdrawal of membership or other disciplinary action. The Word of Wisdom quote regarding tobacco alludes to its historical use in medicine and states:

Tobacco is not for the body, neither for the belly, and is not good for man, but is an herb for bruises and all sick cattle, to be used with judgment and skill.

— Joseph Smith, "Section 89:8" (February 27, 1833), Doctrine and Covenants

=== Islam ===
Sultan Ahmad al-Mansur was one of the first authorities to take action on smoking in 1602, towards the end of his reign. The ruler of the Saadi dynasty used the religious tool of fatwas (Islamic legal pronouncements) to discourage the use of tobacco. A couple of years later, his ally, the Christian ruler James I would publish his treatise, Counterblaste to Tobacco.

The holy book of Islam, the Qur'ān, does not specifically prohibit or denounce smoking, but gives behavioral guidance:

"Don't throw yourself into danger by your own hands ..."

— Quran 2:195

In recent years, tobacco fatwas have been issued due to health concerns. The prominent scholar Yusuf al Qaradawi argues that smoking is no longer an issue of dispute among Islamic scholars due to the knowledge of health risks.

The reported juristic disagreement among Muslim scholars on the ruling concerning smoking, since its appearance and spread, is not usually based on differences between legal proofs, but on the difference in the verification of the cause on which the ruling is based. They all agree that whatever is proved to be harmful to the body and mind is prohibited, yet they differ on whether this ruling applies to smoking. Some of them claimed that smoking has some benefits, others assured that it had few disadvantages compared to its benefits, whereas a third group maintained that it had neither benefits nor bad effects. This means that if scholars had been certain about the harmfulness of smoking, then they would undoubtedly have considered it prohibited....

Second: Our inclination to consider smoking prohibited does not mean that it is as grave as major sins like adultery, drinking alcohol, or theft. Prohibited matters in Islam are relative; some of them are minor prohibitions, whereas others are major, and each has its own ruling. The major sins, for example, have no expiation other than sincere repentance. However, the minor sins can be expiated by the Five Prayers, the Friday Prayer, the Fasting of Ramadan, the Night Vigil Prayer in Ramadan, and other acts of worship. They can also be expiated by avoiding the major sins.

All contemporary rulings tend to condemn smoking as potentially harmful or prohibit (haram) smoking outright as a cause of severe health damage. Arab Muslims tend to prohibit smoking (despite Saudi Arabia ranking 23rd in the world for the percentage of its population that smokes) and, in South Asia, smoking tends to be considered lawful but discouraged:

In many parts of the Arabic-speaking world, the legal status of smoking has further changed during recent years, and numerous religious edicts or fatawa, including from notable authorities such as Al-Azhar University in Egypt, now declare smoking to be prohibited. The reasons cited in support of the reclassification of smoking as prohibited include Islamic law's general prohibition of all actions that result in harm. For example, the Qur'an says, "And spend of your substance in the cause of God, and make not your own hands contribute to your own destruction (Q2:195)." Additionally, jurists rely on the exhortations in the Qur'an not to waste money. Greater appreciation of the risks associated with passive smoking has also led recent jurists to cite the obligation to avoid causing willful annoyance, distress, or harm to other people.

In practice, at least one recent survey (Abbottabad, Pakistan) found that observant Muslims tend to avoid smoking. A study of young Muslim Arab-Americans found that Islamic influences were correlated with some diminished smoking. Conversely, an Egyptian study found that knowledge of an anti-smoking fatwa did not reduce smoking. Overall, the prevalence of smoking is increasing in Islamic countries.

==== Response of the tobacco industry ====
From the 1970s to the late 1990s, tobacco companies including British American Tobacco and Phillip Morris were involved in campaigns to undermine fatwas against smoking in Muslim-majority countries, equating a Muslim opposed to smoking with "a threat to existing government as a 'fundamentalist' who wishes to return to sharia law". The tobacco industry was also concerned that the World Health Organization's encouraging of anti-smoking stance of Muslim scholars. A 1985 report from tobacco firm Philip Morris squarely blamed the WHO: "This ideological development has become a threat to our business because of the interference of the WHO ... The WHO has not only joined forces with Muslim fundamentalists who view smoking as evil, but has gone yet further by encouraging religious leaders previously not active anti-smokers to take up the cause."

=== Judaism ===
Tobacco smoking was very prevalent among Jews as early as the 18th century, and was widely considered as health promoting. Its purported health benefits were described in a number of religious texts of the time as relating to digestion, circulation, and other bodily functions. For this reason, until the 20th century, the discussion regarding smoking within the context of halakha (Jewish law) did not include the possible prohibition due to related adverse health effects. Rather, the focus of the discussion was primarily on the permissibility of smoking on certain occasions and places, as well as concerns related to kashrut (Jewish dietary laws):

- From the very start, smoking on Shabbat was and still is universally considered strictly prohibited among all orthodox Jews, as it involves lighting fire, a grave desecration of Shabbat. The same applies to Yom Kippur, the Jewish day of repentance. According to Judaism, The divine punishment of such a sin is Kareth, the divine excommunication of the soul.
- Since the 17th century the permissibility of smoking on yamim tovim (plural of yom tov), the days of rest of each of the major Jewish hoildays, was and still is - heatly debated: Considered by many highly respected halakhic authorities it to be a major sin, constituting a Mitzvat lo te'aseh, yet deemed permissible by others, under certain conditions.

Early on in the Hasidic movement, the Baal Shem Tov taught that smoking tobacco can be used as a religious devotion, and can even help bring the Messianic Era. Rabbi Levi Yitzchak of Berditchev is quoted as saying that "a Jew smokes on the weekdays and sniffs tobacco on the Sabbath". Rabbi Dovid of Lelov taught that it is a good religious practice to smoke on Saturday nights after the Shabbat, and this practice is followed by the Rebbes of Lelov and Skulen, however the current Rebbe of Skulen discourages people from following his example, in light of current views opposing smoking, and he himself only takes a few brief puffs of a cigarette after Havdalah. Many Hasidic Jews smoke, and many who do not smoke regularly will smoke on the holiday of Purim, even if they do not do so any other time of the year, and some consider it to be a spiritual practice, similar to the smoke of the altar in the ancient Temple. However, in recent years, many Hasidic Rabbis have come out against smoking, as have rabbis of other movements.

Rabbi Yisrael Meir Kagan was one of the first Jewish authorities to speak out on smoking. He considered it a health risk and a waste of time, and had little patience for those who claimed addiction, stating that they never should have started smoking in the first place.

A shift toward health-oriented concerns may be observed in different rabbinic interpretations of Jewish law (halakha). For instance, at a time when the link between smoking and health was still in doubt, Rabbi Moshe Feinstein issued an influential opinion in 1963 stating that smoking was permitted, although still inadvisable. He later stated that a non-smoker is prohibited from developing a smoking habit.

More recently, rabbinic responsa tend to argue that smoking is prohibited as self-endangerment under Jewish law and that smoking in indoor spaces should be restricted as a type of damage to others. The self-endangerment rule is grounded partly on a Biblical verse that is read as an injunction to watch one's health - "ונשמרתם מאד, לנפשתיכם" [Vi'nish'martem Me'od Li'naf'sho'tey'chem] Deut. 04:15 "And you shall watch yourselves very well ..." Similarly, rabbinic rules against damaging others are traced back to Biblical and Talmudic laws.

Famous Ashkenazi Haredi rabbis have called on people not to smoke and called smoking an 'evil habit.' These rabbis include Rabbi Yosef Sholom Eliashiv, Rabbi Aharon Leib Shteinman, Rabbi Moshe Shmuel Shapiro, Rabbi Michel Yehuda Lefkowitz, Rabbi Nissim Karelitz, and Rabbi Shmuel Auerbach. Rabbi Shmuel HaLevi Wosner forbade people from starting to smoke and said that those who smoke should stop doing so. All of these rabbis also said that it is forbidden to smoke in a public place where others might be bothered by it.

Among important Sephardi Haredi rabbis, Rabbi Ben Tzion Abba Shaul, Rabbi Ovadia Yosef and Rabbi Moshe Tzedaka called on youth not to start smoking.

Other major Ashkenazi rabbis who explicitly forbade smoking include Rabbi Eliezer Waldenberg, Rabbi Moshe Stern, and Rabbi Chaim Pinchas Sheinberg, and Rabbi Asher Zelig Weiss.

Among religious zionist rabbis, the view that smoking is strictly prohibited is very widely accepted, and more pronounced than among Haredi rabbis. Smoking is also much less accepted as well as prevalent in zionist yeshivas, as compared to Haredi yeshivas.

== Buddhism ==
In Buddhism, smoking is not explicitly prohibited and Buddhist communities have generally tolerated the practice. A definite Buddhist view towards smoking is ambiguous, and attitudes towards it vary from positive to negative; which vary by institution, teaching, and personal views. The question of smoking isn't considered a significant Buddhist issue, unlike other topics like the consumption of meat. In some southeast Asian Buddhist countries, smoking is prevalent among the population at large and to a certain extent among Buddhist monks, too. There have however been some active anti-smoking campaigns in certain Buddhist communities to help Buddhists quit smoking, and create smoke-free temples and religious sites. It is generally regarded as impolite for visitors to smoke inside pagodas or other Buddhist sites.

== Native American religions ==
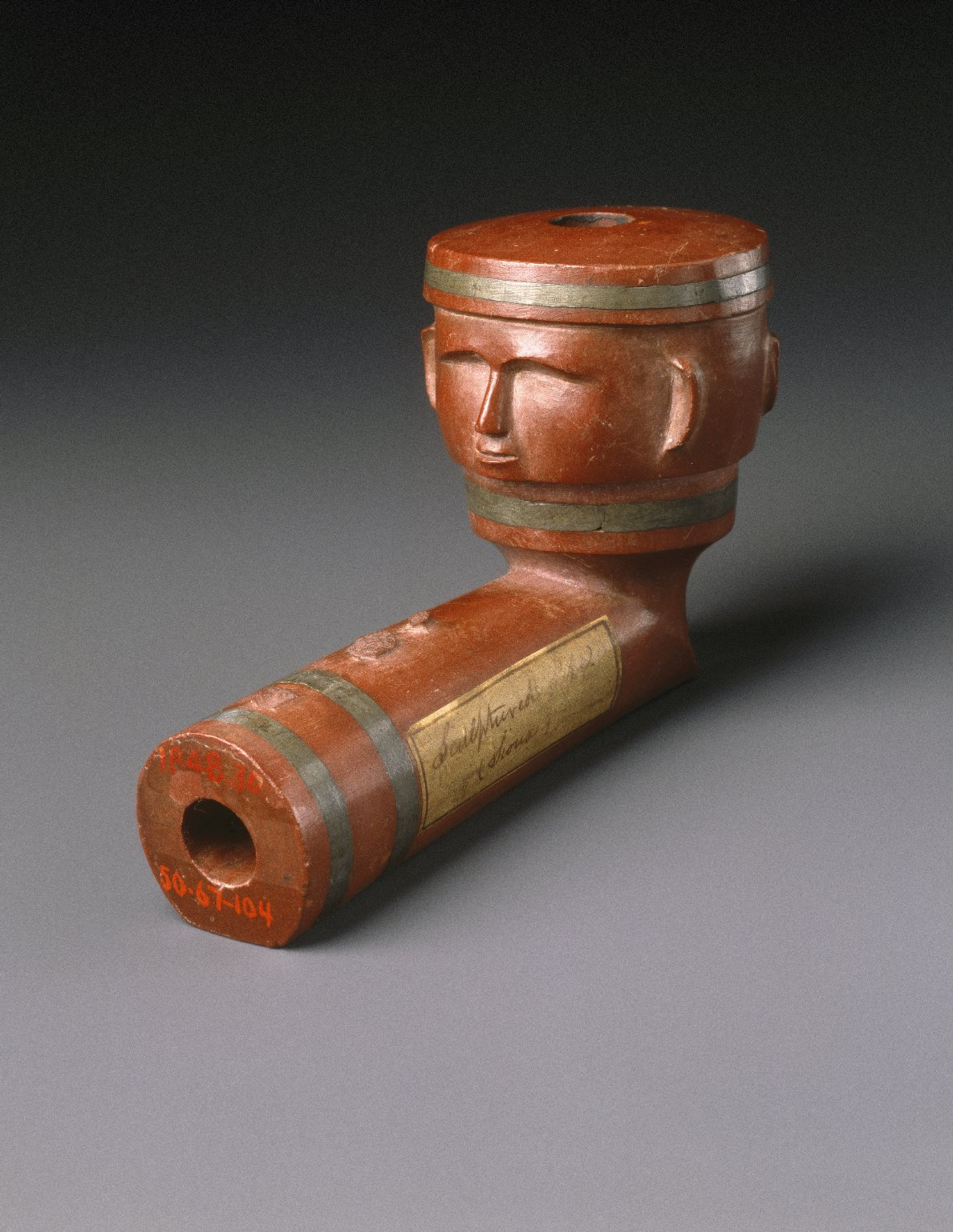
Catlinite Inlayed Pipe Bowl with Two Faces, early 19th century, Sisseton Sioux

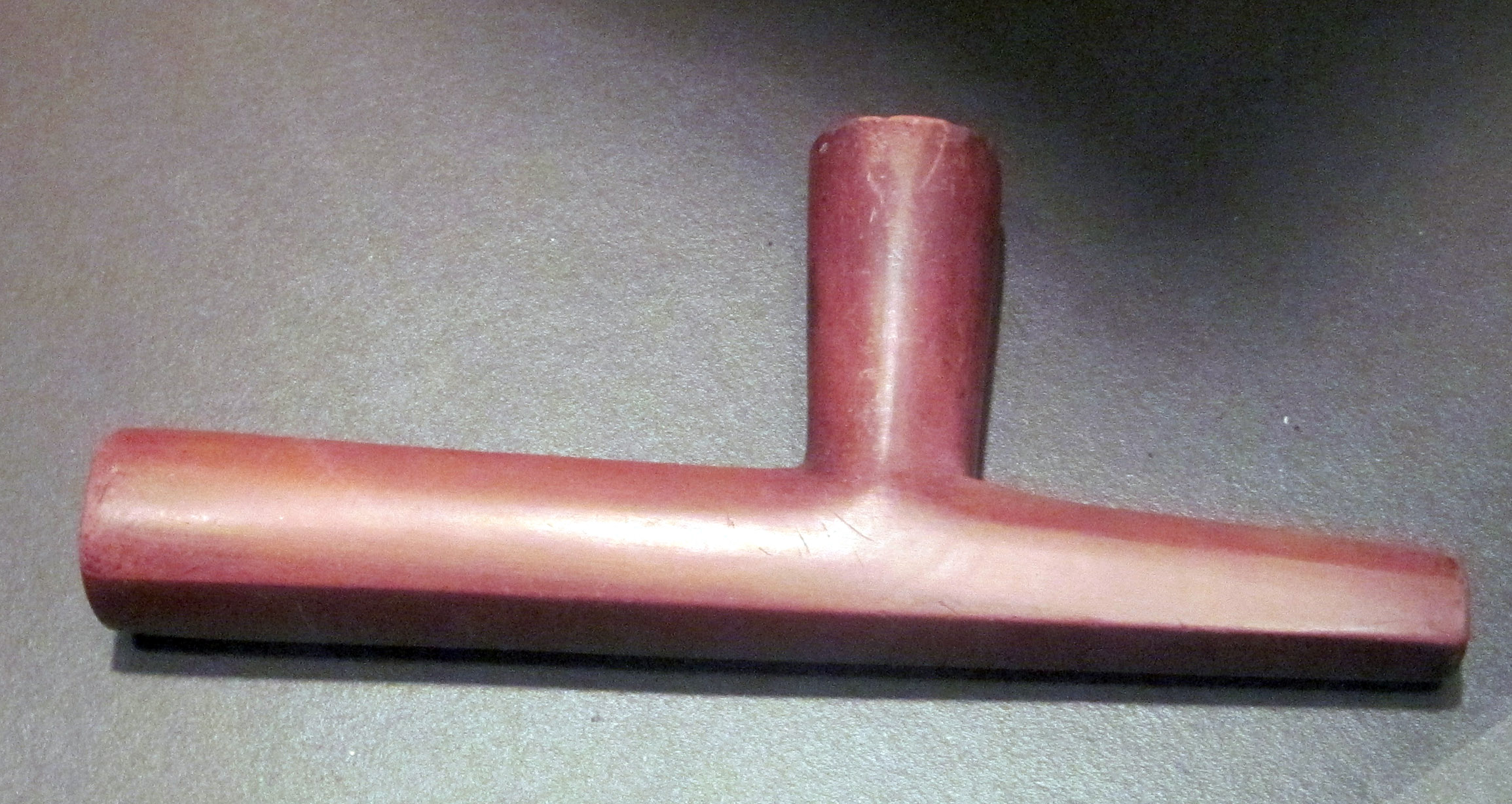
Ceremonial pipe bowl of catlinite used by Black Hawk, of the Sauk people

Communal smoking of a sacred pipe is a religious ceremony in several Native American cultures, while other tribes are social smokers only, if they smoke at all. In some cases tobacco is smoked, in other cases, kinnikinnick, or a combination of the two.

Naturally grown and harvested tobacco, prepared in the ways traditional to intact Native American and First Nations ceremonial communities, is very different from commercially marketed tobacco. Commercial tobacco usually contains chemical additives and much higher levels of nicotine. In ceremonial usage, much smaller amounts of natural tobacco are burned than in secular, recreational tobacco smoking. There is a movement among Native peoples, including a resolution by The National Congress of American Indians, to make sure that only naturally-grown tobacco is used in ceremonies, and that social smoking and use of commercial tobacco be avoided or ended altogether.

WHEREAS, the quality of commercial tobacco products has been compromised due to the chemical engineering by the tobacco industry and commercial tobacco contains 7,000 chemical additives (such as rat poison, formaldehyde, ammonia, acetone, arsenic and many more) that are harmful to health; and commercial tobacco disrespects the fundamental cultural traditions of American Indians and Alaska Natives; ...

...

NOW THEREFORE BE IT RESOLVED, that the National Congress of American Indians does hereby endorse policies for the protection of tribal community members from tobacco use and secondhand smoke exposure through comprehensive tribal commercial tobacco-free air policies (including all forms of commercial tobacco products) in indoor workplaces and public places (including tribal casinos), providing access to high quality tobacco cessation services, and promotes the creation of policy to dis-incentivize individuals from purchasing and using commercial tobacco products; - National Congress of American Indians Resolution #SPO-16-046

In Brazil, among the Wauja people of the Upper Xingu, tobacco plays a central role in shamanic rituals, serving as a tool for vision, spiritual mediation, healing, and cosmological communication. It is the only psychoactive plant used by the indigenous peoples of this region in these contexts and is present in every stage of the ritual process associated with the apapaatai—animal spirits that are both feared and necessary, capable of both causing illness and bringing healing.

== Sikhism ==
Guru Gobind Singh prohibited his Sikhs from smoking tobacco. He called tobacco "jagat jooth" (Punjabi: "the world's impurity").

A legend states that when Guru Gobind Singh Ji was riding his blue horse, Neela, it would not enter a tobacco field and reared up in front of it.

Among people of South Asian ancestry (primarily Punjabi Sikhs) residing in the Fraser Health Authority of the Metro Vancouver Regional District, the smoking rate was less than 5% in 2013–2014.

== Baháʼí Faith ==
In the Baháʼí Faith, smoking is not forbidden but is discouraged.

== Zoroastrianism ==
The idea of smoking tobacco has been looked down upon in modern Zoroastrian communities due to the scientific knowledge of it causing harm to the body. This stance on smoking does not have a direct relation to the texts of the Avestas and is not stated in the religion; rather, the religion teaches not to misuse fire as it is holy. Zoroastrianism teaches to do what is best for the world based on the knowledge a person has on the topic, and indirectly, the knowledge of smoking being harmful to the body causes people to condemn the act.
