= Omar Pasigan =

Filipino Islamic Scholar

Sheikh Omar Pasigan
- Died: November 20, 2018

Religious life
- Religion: Islam

Muslim leader
- Post: Grand Mufti of Central Mindanao

Sheikh Omar Pasigan was a Filipino Islamic scholar who served as the Grand Mufti of Central Mindanao.

Pasigan was a founder of the Moro National Liberation Front and later of the breakaway group, the Moro Islamic Liberation Front.

As Grand Mufti, he issued multiple fatwa. In 2004, he clarified that Islam is not against family planning, stating that while abortion is prohibited, all forms of contraception permitted under Sharia are allowed. In 2010, he declared smoking and promoting cigarettes as haram.

A graduate of Al-Azhar University in Cairo, Pasigan established the Mahad al-Ulum al-Islamia, the largest madrasa in Cotabato City.

He died on November 20, 2018.
