= Muʽassel =

Syrupy tobacco mixture used in hookah pipes

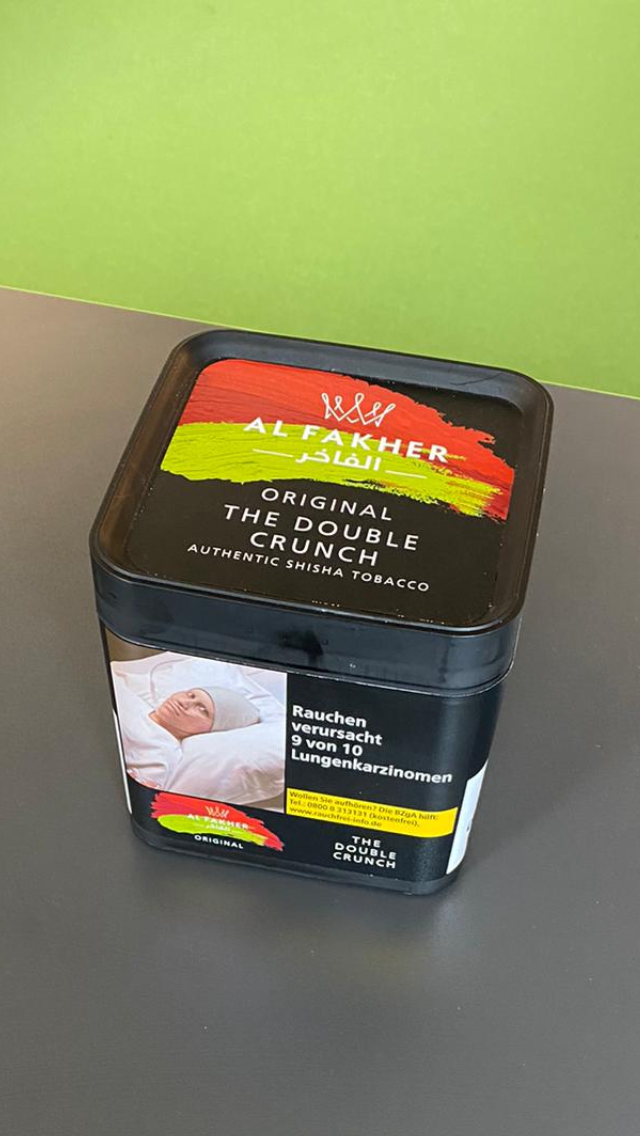
A package of Al Fakher brand double crunch flavour muʽassel with warning label affixed

Muʽassel (Arabic: معسل, meaning "honeyed"), or maassel, is a tobacco mix containing molasses, vegetable glycerol and various flavourings which is smoked in a hookah, a type of waterpipe. It is also known as "shisha".

Argilah or Argileh (Arabic: أرجيلة, sometimes pronounced Argilee), and shisha or sheesha (شيشة), is the common term for the hookah itself in the Arab world.

== History ==
Although hookah pipes have been used for several hundred years, muʽassel is a recent invention, going back to the early 20th Century in Egypt. Before this, only lightly processed tobacco was smoked in hookah pipes. This form of tobacco needed to be mixed with water, squeezed, and molded prior to use. It was hard to keep lit and produced a strong harsh smell and taste with a potent nicotine delivery. At the end of the twentieth century, hookah was no longer a very popular way to smoke tobacco, and in the Middle East was popular mainly among older, Arab men who smoked it with friends in cafes. Young people became interested in hookah use beginning in the early 1990s when milder sweetened and flavored hookah tobacco, commonly called Muʽassel, first became available. This is made by fermenting tobacco with molasses, glycerine and flavoring agents, producing a moist and pliable mixture. Due to the ease of use and the variety of pleasant flavors offered, as well as increased internet availability, it quickly became the most common type of hookah tobacco globally.

== Culture ==
=== Middle East ===
==== Arab world ====
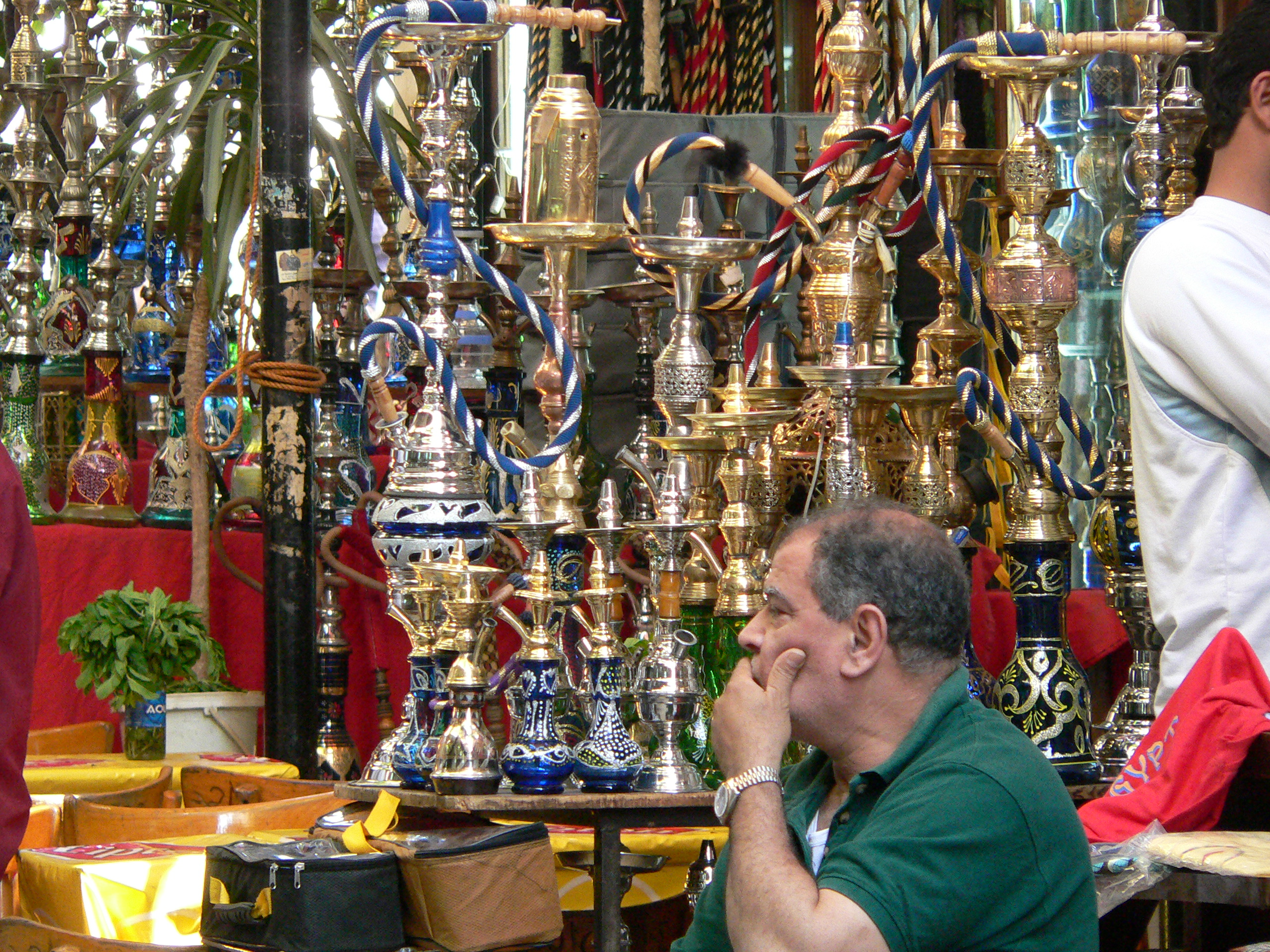
A hookah shop in Cairo

In many places in the Arab world, the smoking of shisha is a part of traditional culture, and is considered a social custom. Social smoking is typically done with the use of a hookah with a single hose which is passed around the group or double hose, but some hookahs can employ up to four hoses. When the smoker is finished, the hose is either placed back on the table, signifying that it is available, or is handed directly to the next user. Social convention dictates that the mouthpiece and hose should be folded back on itself in such a way that the mouthpiece is not pointing at the recipient. Disposable mouth tips are sometimes used in cafes.

Many cafés in the Middle East offer hookah. Cafés are widespread and are common social gathering places (akin to public houses in Britain). Some expatriate residents arriving in the Middle East frequent hookah cafés in lieu of pubs in the region, especially where prohibition is in place and alcohol is not served.

In the Levant (Syria, Palestine, Lebanon, Jordan), hookah (sometimes referred to as "arguileh", or "narguileh") is widely used, and its availability is nearly universal. Hookah has become part of the culture. Smokers are often seen on the side of the streets, parks, bus stops, and other public venues. Cafes are sometimes observed to be fully occupied by hookah smokers, even during late hours of the night. It is not uncommon to see women smoking hookah. In the Levant, it is very social, and the activity is often accompanied by a game of Tawla (Backgammon), cards, or tea.

==== Iran ====
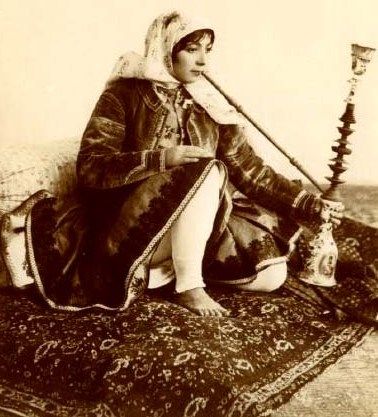
Iranian woman in Qajari dress smoking tobacco

In Iran, the hookah is known as a ḡalyān (Persian: قليان, قالیون, غلیون, also spelled ghalyan, ghalyaan or ghelyoon). It is similar in many ways to the Arabic hookah but also differs in several ways. One difference is the uppermost part of the hookah, the "ghalyoun," locally called 'sar' (سر, i.e. head), where the tobacco is placed. Compared to Turkish hookahs, the Iranian version tends to be somewhat larger. Additionally, the majority of the hose is flexible and covered with soft silk or cloth, while Turkish hookahs often have mouthpieces and partially rigid hoses which are as long as or longer than the flexible part of the hose.

Each smoker will typically carry their own personal mouthpiece (called an amjid, امجید). The amjid is a detachable hookah mouthpiece, and is usually made of wood or metal and may be decorated with gemstones. Amjids are considered to be decorative and are a highly personal item. Public smoking venues will often carry disposable or cleanable amjid for the use of smokers who do not carry their own.

The exact date of the first use of ḡalyān in Persia is not known. According to Cyril Elgood, it was Abu’l-Fatḥ Gīlānī, a Persian physician at the court of the Mughal emperor Akbar I, who "first passed the smoke of tobacco through a small bowl of water to purify and cool the smoke and thus invented the hubble-bubble or hookah." However, Ahlī Šīrāzī refers to the use of the ḡalyān in one of his poems, thus dating its use to at least as early as the time of Ṭahmāsp I in the late 14th century. Therefore Abu’l-Fatḥ Gīlānī may be credited with the introduction of the Persian ḡalyān in India.

Although the Safavid Shah ʿAbbās I strongly condemned tobacco use, towards the end of his reign smoking ḡalyān and čopoq (a long-stemmed pipe with a small bowl for smoking tobacco, distinct from the ḡ/qalyān, or water pipe.) had become common at every level of society. In schools and learned circles, both teachers and students smoked during lessons. Smoking was so popular, that the shah had his own private ḡalyān servant, and the first evidence for the position of hookah tender (ḡalyāndār) dates from this time. At this time, water pipes were made from materials such as glass, pottery, and a particular type of gourd. Due to the unsatisfactory quality of indigenous glassware, glass reservoirs were sometimes imported from Venice. In the time of Shah Solaymān in the late 15th and early 16th century, ḡalyāns became more elaborately embellished as their use increased. The wealthy owned gold and silver pipes, and even the general population spent more on ḡalyāns than they did on the basic necessities of life. An emissary of Shah Sultan Husayn, to the court of Louis XV in the early 16th century, on his way to the royal audience at Versailles, had in his retinue an officer holding his ḡalyān, which he used while his carriage was in motion. We have no record indicating the use of ḡalyān at the court of Nāder Shah Afšār, although its use seems to have continued uninterrupted. There are portraits of Karīm Khan Zand and Fatḥ-ʿAlī Shah Qājār which depict them smoking the ḡalyān. Iranians had a special tobacco called Khansar (خانسار, presumably name of the origin city). With Khansar, coals would be put on the Khansar without foil. Khansar has less smoke than the normal tobacco.

=== Caucasus ===
==== Azerbaijan ====
It is one of the popular entertainment and hangout activities, mostly among young men in Azerbaijan, especially in Baku.

=== South Asia ===
==== Pakistan ====
Hookah (called chillum or huqqa in Pakistan) is the most common way to consume tobacco among elderly in lower socio-economic and rural people in Pakistan. However, in recent years, use has increased among youth and urban residents, who often consume hookah in cafes.

==== India ====
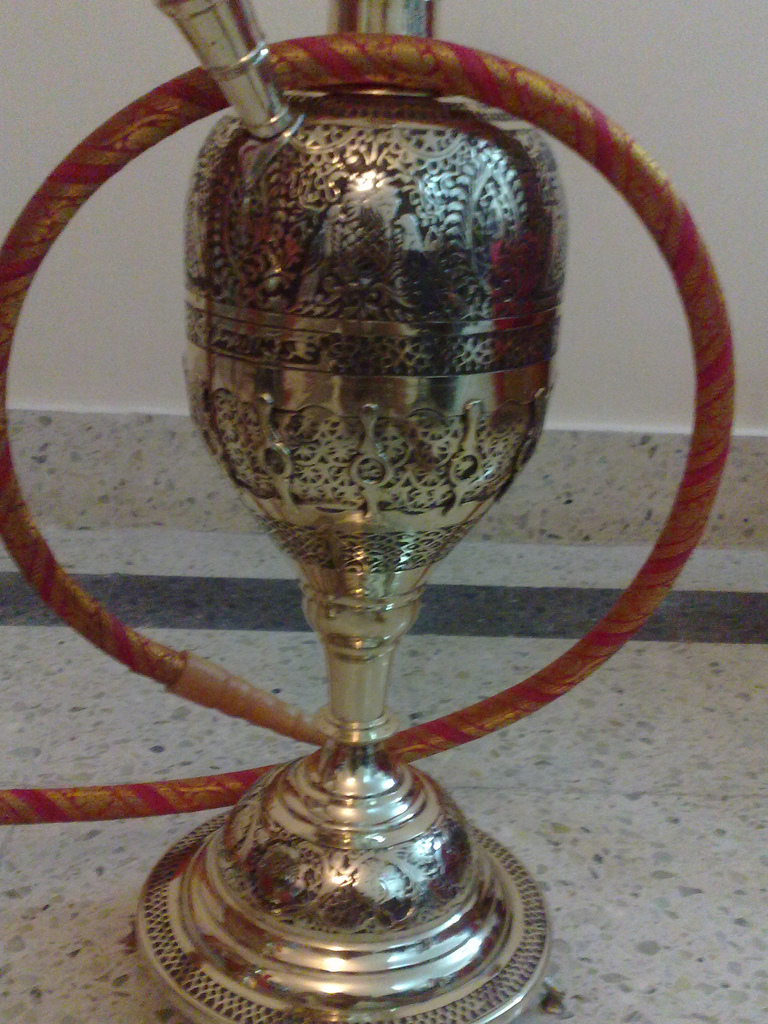
The intricate work on a Malabar Hookah

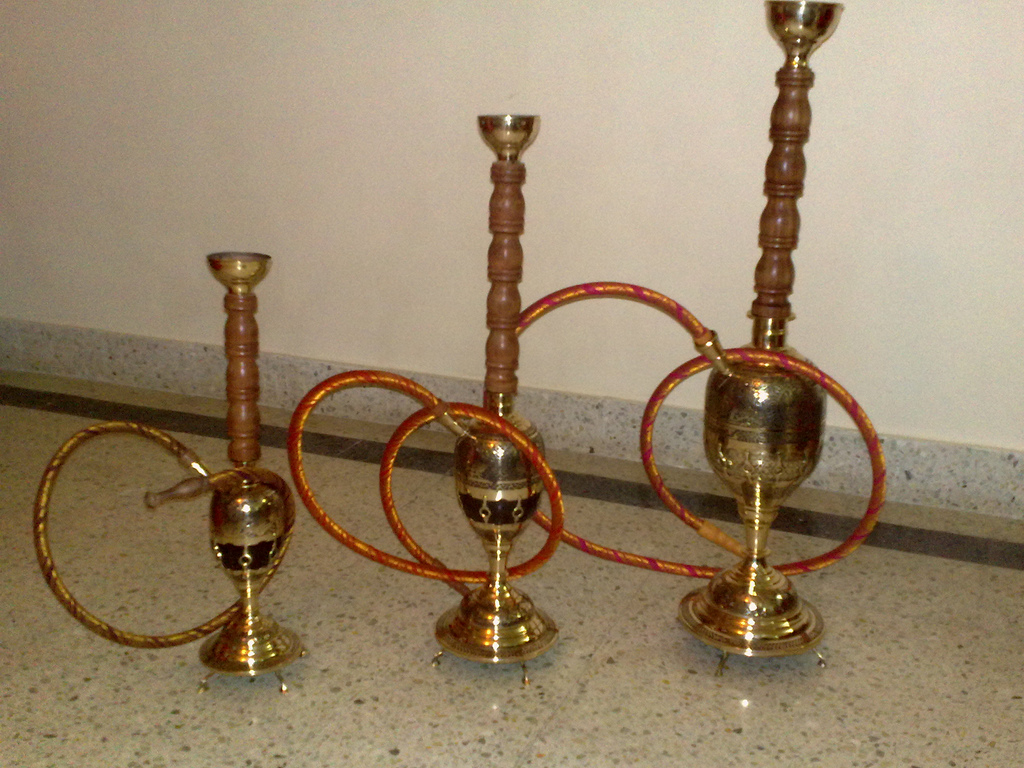
The hookah family

Hookah was popular in India especially during Mughal rule. The hookah then become less popular; however, it is once again garnering the attention of the masses, and cafés and restaurants that offer it as a consumable are popular. The use of hookahs from ancient times in India was not only a custom, but a matter of prestige. Rich and landed classes would smoke hookahs.

Tobacco is smoked in hookahs in many villages as per traditional customs. Smoking a tobacco-molasses shisha is now becoming popular amongst the youth in India. There are several chain clubs, bars and coffee shops in India offering a wider variety of muʽassels, including non-tobacco versions. Hookah was recently banned in Bangalore. However it can be bought or rented for personal usage or organised parties only.

Koyilandy, a small fishing town on the west coast of India, once made and exported hookahs extensively. These are known as Malabar Hookhas or Koyilandy Hookahs. Today these intricate hookahs are difficult to find outside of Koyilandy and not much easier to find in Koyilandy itself.

Due to their harm to health, hookah has recently been banned in many states in India. There have been numerous raids and bans recently on hookah smoking, especially in Gujarat

=== Nepal ===
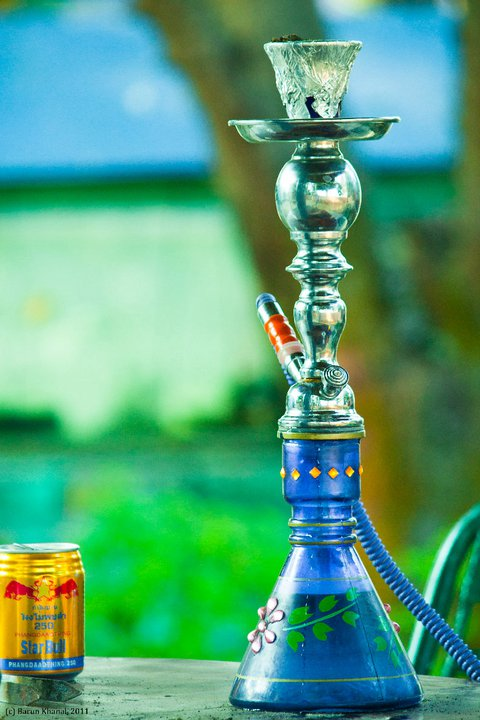
A hookah at a restaurant in Nepal

Hookahs (हुक़्क़ा), especially wooden ones, are popular in Nepal. Historically, hookah usage was considered to symbolize elite family status. Today, however, hookahs have become popular among tourists and young people.

=== Bangladesh ===
Hookah, as the traditional smoking device, has been commonly used in Bangladesh since the Mughal ages. But mu'assel wasn't introduced in Bangladesh until the early 2000s. Hookah became very popular among the young crowds, and hookah bars and lounges opened up in large numbers to cater to those crowds. However, due to health concerns and unregulated consumption, the government banned hookah in late 2010 and hookah lounges were ordered to shut down. A few hookah lounges were given permission to continue business as they mostly served to foreigners.

=== Southeast Asia ===
==== Philippines ====
In the Philippines, hookah use was more or less traditionally confined to the minority Arab Filipino and Indian Filipino communities. The custom has also been present in the indigenous Muslim Filipino community (a considerable religious minority), where a historical following of Middle Eastern socio-cultural trends led to the hookah being a rare—albeit prestigious—social habit of the nobility in the vital trade hubs of Mindanao such as Cotabato and Jolo.

Hookah was meanwhile virtually unknown to the predominant Christian Filipinos in Luzon and the Visayas before the late 20th century. Presently, hookah use is gaining popularity among younger, more cosmopolitan Christians, particularly with college students and young adults who may be underage and thus unable to purchase cigarettes.

In the National Capital Region and other conurbations such as Metro Cebu and Metro Davao, hookahs and flavoured shisha are available in various high-end bars, clubs and "shisha lounges" as well as in traditional Middle Eastern restaurants.

==== Vietnam ====
In Vietnam, shisha has been around for a long time, but has been gaining popularity among young people, due to the belief that smoking shisha is better than smoking cigarette due to less nicotine. People can smoke shisha at cafes, karaoke bars and bars in Vietnam.

=== South Africa ===
In South Africa, hookah, colloquially known as a hubbly bubbly or an okka pipe, is popular.

=== United States and Canada ===
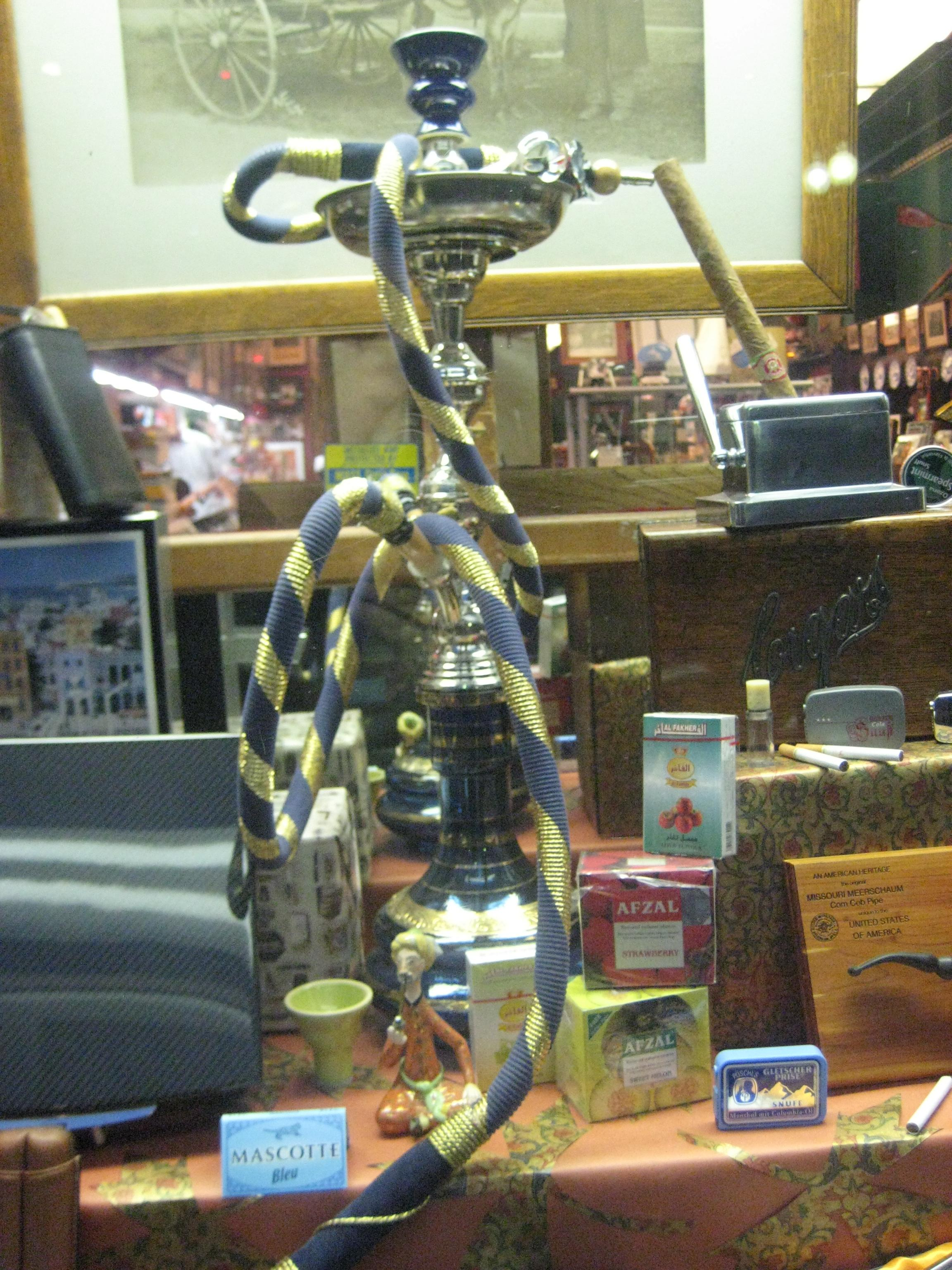
A hookah and a variety of muʽassel packages are on display in a Harvard Square store window in Cambridge, Massachusetts, United States.

Hookah was popular in the 1960s and 1970s, although in this era they used open flames rather than coals. In recent years hookah use has increased dramatically in the United States and Canada. Hookah bars and cafes have become popular especially among college students and young adults in big cities across North America. A major reason for this popularity is thought to be the invention of mu’assel in the early 1990s; this moist sweetened and flavored hookah tobacco is popular among young people because the tobacco is masked with a pleasant taste and aroma. There is a growing hookah bar and café industry, especially in inner cities and near universities and colleges where youth and young adults gather.

Recently, certain cities, counties, and states have implemented indoor smoking bans, many of which include hookah. In some jurisdictions, hookah businesses can be exempted from the policies through special permits. Some permits, however, have requirements such as the business earning a certain minimum percentage of their revenue from alcohol or tobacco.

In cities with indoor smoking bans, hookah bars have been forced to close or switch to tobacco-free muʽassel. In many cities though, hookah lounges have been growing in popularity. From the year 2000 to 2004, over 200 new hookah cafés opened for business, most of them targeted at young adults and located near college campuses or cities with large Middle-Eastern communities. This activity continues to gain popularity within the post-secondary student demographic. According to a 2018 study, 1.1% of students with some college but no degree, an associate degree or an undergraduate degree reported waterpipe or pipe tobacco product use either every day or some days. As of November 2017, at least 2,082 college or university campuses in the U.S. have adopted 100% smokefree campus policies that attempt to eliminate smoking in indoor and outdoor areas across the entire campus, including residences.

Hookah use by youth and adolescents rose from 1998 even as cigarette use decreased: youth hookah use more than doubled from 2011 to 2014 according to the Centers for Disease Control and Prevention. However, since then the US Department of Health and Human Services has stated that older teens have decreased their use of hookahs in recent years. The most recent research, from 2014 to 2018, shows that the percentage of high school seniors who had used a hookah in the last year decreased from 20 percent to 8 percent. Among adolescents and young adults, hookah use is highest among those aged 19–20, and those who live in cities. It is less common in suburban and rural areas. In 2011, 18.5% of 12th-grade students reported having smoked a hookah in the past year. By 2019, 3.4% of highschool students reported having used hookah in the last 30 days.

== Health effects ==
Smoking muʽassel exposes users to many of the same harmful and toxic chemicals found in cigarette smoke. Several of the toxic chemicals in mu’assel smoke can cause cancer, including polycyclic aromatic hydrocarbons (e.g., benzopyrene), heavy metals (e.g., arsenic, chromium, uranium, polonium, lead), and microparticles.

A single hookah session results in far more toxic materials inhaled than a session of cigarette smoking, largely because a session of hookah use is much longer than an average session of cigarette smoking: 60 minutes on average for a hookah session versus five minutes for a single cigarette. A typical session of smoking muʽassel results in a user inhaling 90,000 ml of smoke versus 500 ml for a cigarette, as well as 1.7 times as much nicotine, 8.4 times as much carbon monoxide, and 36 times as much tar. Muʽassel smoking also exposes users to heavy metals and is thought to expose users to more carcinogens than cigarettes.

Hookah smokers inhale large amounts of carbon monoxide generated from the combustion of tobacco as well as the charcoal used to burn the mu’assel. Carbon monoxide is a highly toxic odorless gas that can damage the heart and central nervous system. There have been many cases of carbon monoxide poisoning among hookah smokers that require treatment in hospital emergency departments for symptoms such as headache, nausea, vomiting, dizziness, fatigue and weakness. This is sometimes called “hookah sickness.” The charcoal used to heat up the muʽassel increases carbon monoxide and metal inhalation.

Studies have led the American Lung Association, Centers for Disease Control and Prevention, and Food and Drug Administration to conclude that smoking muʽassel using a hookah "has many of the same health risks as cigarette smoking." These risks include lung cancer, COPD, low birth weight in babies, increased risk of respiratory disease in babies, increased risk of heart disease, as well as oral, stomach, esophagus and bladder cancers. Herbal muʽassel and shisha poses similar risks to the tobacco-containing counterpart: smoke from herbal muʽassel contains equal or greater levels of carbon monoxide, nitric oxide, aldehydes, tar, and carcinogenic polycyclic aromatic hydrocarbons (PAH) as tobacco-containing smoke. These chemicals contribute to cancers, heart disease, and lung disease.

In addition, mu’assel contains nicotine, which is addictive, which can make quitting hookah difficult and cause withdrawal symptoms such as irritability and depression when people go without the drug for an extended time.

Smoking muʽassel in a hookah also releases secondhand smoke that harms the health of those around the smoker. Secondhand smoke from hookahs contains carbon monoxide, polycyclic aromatic hydrocarbons/Tar, aldehydes, and microparticles that can enter the lungs. Studies of hookah lounges in Virginia have found that hookah lounges have worse air quality than comparable restaurants that allow indoor cigarette smoking. Acute effects of exposure to secondhand smoke from hookahs including wheezing, nasal congestion, and chronic cough, although long term effects have yet to be studied. The detrimental effects of secondhand smoke from hookahs apply equally to tobacco-free muʽassel or shisha: one study found that herbal hookah smoke contains carcinogens equal or greater to that of hookah smoke with tobacco, in addition to PAH, carbon monoxide, and metals.

== See also ==
- Smoking in Syria
