= Vaporized Nicotine and Non-Nicotine Products Regulation Act =

Law regulating the use of nicotine

Congress of the Philippines
- Long title: An Act Regulating the Importation, Manufacture, Sale, Packaging, Distribution, Use, and Communication of Vaporized Nicotine and Non-Nicotine Products, and Novel Tobacco Products
- Citation: Republic Act No. 11900
- Enacted by: House of Representatives of the Philippines
- Enacted by: Senate of the Philippines
- Commenced: July 25, 2022

Legislative history

Initiating chamber: House of Representatives of the Philippines
- Bill citation: House Bill 9007
- Introduced: January 26, 2022

Revising chamber: Senate of the Philippines
- Bill citation: Senate Bill 2239
- Received from the House of Representatives of the Philippines: January 25, 2022
- Status: In force

The Vaporized Nicotine and Non-Nicotine Products Regulation Act, officially recorded as Republic Act No. 11900, is a law in the Philippines which aims to regulate the "importation, sale, packaging, distribution, use and communication of vaporized nicotine and non-nicotine products and novel tobacco products", such as electronic cigarettes and heated tobacco products. It lapsed into law on July 25, 2022. As a proposed measure, the law was known as the Vape Regulation Bill.

== Background and history ==
In 2015, the Global Adult Tobacco Survey reported 16.5 million Filipinos smoke tobacco. Tobacco smoking is the leading cause of preventable disease worldwide and generates more illness and premature death than any other avoidable cause. About 110,000 Filipinos die from tobacco-related diseases each year, with about 18.6% of deaths caused by tobacco smoke and 16.6% by tobacco.

Tobacco control efforts in the Philippines have been put in place to address this public health concern. In 2003, the Philippines enacted the Tobacco Regulation Act or Republic Act 9211, which initially provided for smoke-free environments in public spaces, access restrictions, advertising restrictions, as well as initial warnings on tobacco products. It also created an Inter-Agency Committee on Tobacco to implement the law, but the committee included a representative from the tobacco industry.

Regulation of tobacco and tobacco products is vested with the Food and Drug Administration (FDA), by way of Republic Act No. 9711 and its implementing rules and regulations (IRR). RA 9711 states that the FDA has the authority to “develop and issue standards and appropriate authorizations that would cover establishments, facilities and health products," while the IRR provides that the FDA is responsible for protecting the public's health against the injurious effects arising from the use of tobacco and tobacco products, and has the responsibility for their regulation.

Another landmark tobacco control law is the Graphic Health Warnings Law (Republic Act 10643), enacted in 2014, sought to regulate graphic health warnings on the packaging of tobacco products.

In 2017, then-president Rodrigo Duterte signed Executive Order No. 26, which established smoke-free environments in public places nationwide, citing the Constitutional right to health of people and the State's duty to instill health consciousness among them. The Order also emphasized that "public health takes precedence over any commercial or business interest."

In 2019, the Global Youth Tobacco Survey reported that 10.8% of students, aged 13 to 15 years old, smoke tobacco, and that 14.1% of such 13- to 15-year-old students already used e-cigarettes. In 2020, Duterte released another order, Executive Order No. 106, this time to address the proliferation of electronic nicotine and non-nicotine delivery systems (ENDS/ENNDS), as well as heated tobacco and other novel tobacco products. Citing the World Health Organization, EO 106 stated that "ENDS/ENNDS are unlikely to be harmless, such that long-term use is expected to increase the risk of chronic obstructive pulmonary disease, lung cancer, possible cardiovascular disease, as well as some other diseases associated with smoking."

Republic Act No. 11346, as amended in 2020 by Republic Act No. 11467, also regulated the use of heated tobacco products and vapor products by:

- Limiting the age of access to such harmful products to persons 21 years old and above (Sec. 144, RA 11346 as amended by RA 11467);
- Banning the use of flavors, except tobacco and menthol (Sec. 144, RA 11346 as amended by RA 11467);
- Imposing graphic health warnings (Sec. 144, RA 11346 as amended by RA 11467); and
- Designating the FDA as the regulator for heated tobacco and vapor products, to protect public health (Sec. 144, RA 11346 as amended by RA 11467).

== Public health implications ==
The official name of the law is An Act Regulating the Importation, Manufacture, Sale, Packaging, Distribution, Use, and Communication of Vaporized Nicotine and Non-nicotine Products, and Novel Tobacco Products, with the short name of Vaporized Nicotine and Non-Nicotine Products Regulation Act.

The law's purported aims include environmental protection, protection against unknown harms of the new products, "tobacco harm reduction," and reduction in the use of nicotine products by minors. Notably, the Department of Health opposed the measure before its passage, calling it a "retrogressive" bill that "contradict public health goals and international standards." The health department further criticized the bill for relaxing already-existing prohibitions that sought to strictly regulate the use of ENDS/ENNDS, which were already contained in RA 11346, as amended by RA 11467.

Among others, RA 11900:

- Allowed younger users to access the harmful products, by lowering the age of access to 18 years old and above (Section 6).
- Banning only the marketing of "flavor descriptors" that unduly appeal to minors, thus allowing actual flavors (Sec. 12[j]).
- Transferred the jurisdiction of the FDA to the Department of Trade and Industry as the entity with exclusive jurisdiction over heated tobacco and vapor products (Sec. 21)

Former health secretaries, youth groups, and non-government organizations opposed the bill. Former health secretaries Dr. Alfredo Bengzon, Dr. Esperanza Cabral, Dr. Manuel Dayrit, Dr. Enrique Ona, Dr. Carmencita Reodica, Dr. Paulyn Ubial, and Dr. Jaime Galvez Tan stated that the bill was "a huge step backward in protecting Filipinos’ health...especially in a pandemic.

The Child Rights Network objected to executive inaction in allowing the bill to become law, which for them is a "toxic legislation masquerading as a trade regulation law" that would "harm generations of Filipino children and youth." Health advocacy organization Sin Tax Coalition predicted that the law would lead to increased vaping and said the "passage of the law meant that the tobacco industry's interests have prevailed over public health and fake news won over science."

The Sin Tax Coalition added that it is "dismayed that a few doctors and consumer groups have fallen prey to the tobacco industry's misinformation."

Other medical practitioners supported the passage of the law. Cardiologist Rafael Castillo, former president of the Philippine Heart Association-Philippine College of Cardiology, called the bill "historic legislation that will become part of the legacy of the Duterte administration." Dr. Lorenzo Mata, president of Quit for Good, said that the bill "will inform millions of adult Filipino smokers about less harmful alternatives that are available and should be available to them, while the youth and non-smokers are protected."

Pursuant to Section 24 of R.A. 11900, the DTI promulgated Administrative Order No. 24-08, 2024, the amendments to the Implementing Rules and Regulations.

== See also ==
- Electronic cigarette
- Heated tobacco product
- Snus
- Nicotine pouch
- Smoking in the Philippines
