= Effects of climate change on health in the Philippines =

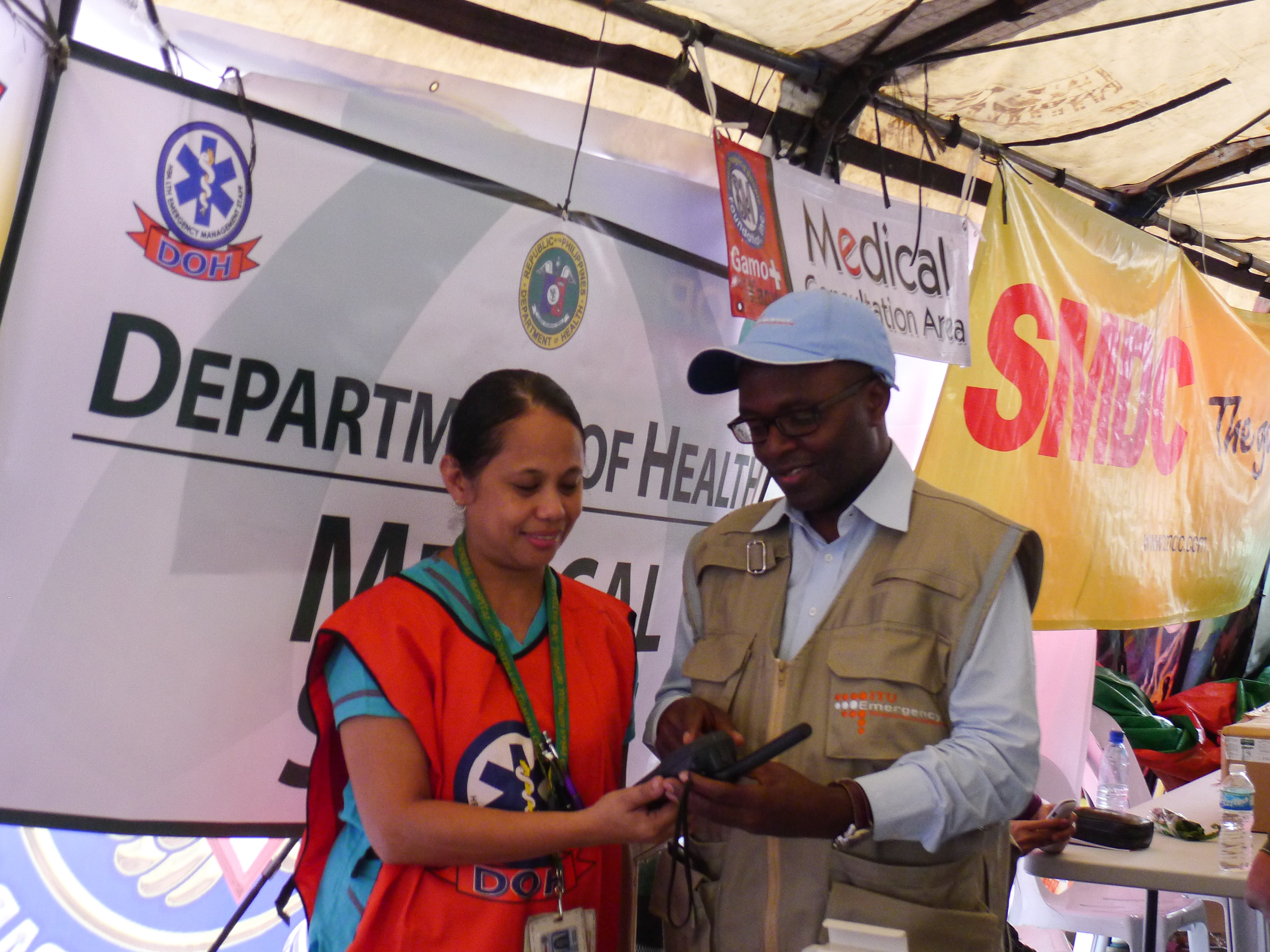
Health response following Typhoon Haiyan in 2013

The effects of climate change on health in the Philippines are significant, heightening risks of vector and water-borne diseases and illnesses, mental distress and illness, and food and water insecurity while also aggravating existing health inequalities for the population of over 110 million people. The Philippines is one of the world's most climate-vulnerable countries, ranking first on the World Risk Index's assessment of countries' natural disaster risk and internal vulnerabilities for the third year in a row in 2024. Multiple climate-related hazards threaten at least 60 percent of the country's land mass, where 74 percent of the population lives.

People living within coastal areas and people living in dense cities due to rapid urbanization are at high risk of flooding related to sea level rise and extreme heat. Lower income city dwellers and displaced peoples are also exposed to greater harms from climate hazards and disasters because they live in informal settlements that have little protection and infrastructure and do not have the resources to cope. Climate change exploits social vulnerabilities and worsens health outcomes for certain groups such as children and the elderly who are more at risk of infectious disease because of their lower immune systems and mobility limitations. People with lower incomes are also further disadvantaged due to limited job opportunities caused by climate change and climate-related natural disasters.

Shifts in temperature, rainfall patterns, and humidity in the Philippines influence infectious organisms linked to the spread of disease. Mosquito populations have increased substantially, leading to an uptick in diseases such as dengue and malaria that are highly sensitive to weather changes. Floods harm sanitation and contaminate water, providing for the incubation and greater spread of disease and also contributing to a lack of available drinking water. Detrimental effects of climate change to crop growth and higher food prices with less production have contributed to food insecurity and malnutrition, which has significantly harmed child development.

== Climate change in the Philippines ==
For more information, see Climate change in the Philippines.

The geography of the Philippines partially contributes to its high exposure to natural disasters and the effects of its changing climate. It is located by the Pacific Ring of Fire, the most seismically active part of the world, and at the junction of two tectonic plates, exposing it to frequent earthquakes and volcanic eruptions. Being in the Northwestern Pacific Basin, the most active tropical cyclone basin in the world, the Philippines is particularly vulnerable to typhoons, which are only intensifying with climate change. And as an archipelago with 7,107 islands, its coastal areas are at high risk to storm surges, sea level rise, and tsunamis.

Major climate patterns within the Philippines include temperature and rainfall changes as well as rising sea levels and coastal erosion. Maximum and minimum temperatures are increasing in the Philippines and hot extremes are intensifying. The average annual temperature has risen by 0.2 degrees Celsius per decade from 1961 to 2015. Due to the warmer atmosphere, instances of extreme rainfall, characterized by greater intensity and frequency of rain, are increasing, leading to greater risks of flooding and soil erosion. Variations in rainfall patterns due to climate change have also profoundly impacted the Philippines. Additionally, global warming has contributed to significant rates in sea level rise in the Philippines, where the sea is rising three to four times faster than the global average sea level of 3.3mm/year. Higher sea levels have led to increased coastal erosion, having major impacts on the population, as over 60 percent of people live within coastal areas, and impacts on agriculture, as some food is grown on land close to sea level.

== Food insecurity ==
Changes to the climates, such as typhoons, flooding, and drought, have reduced overall crop productivity in the Philippines, leaving many people food insecure. Malnutrition from shortages in food also increases the occurrence and spread of communicable diseases. While the population continues to grow, food production has declined as much as 25 percent. Temperature changes and differences in onset and recession of the rainy reason are disrupting crop growth, especially for staple crops such as rice that are sensitive to water and heat stress. Although greater carbon fertilization with hotter temperatures can increase the yield of major grains like rice and corn, if higher temperatures are met before certain growth stages, effects on growth are deleterious. For example, every 1 degree Celsius increase in night time temperature resulted in a 10 percent decrease in crop yield. Higher temperatures also encourage weeds and pests that decrease crop production.

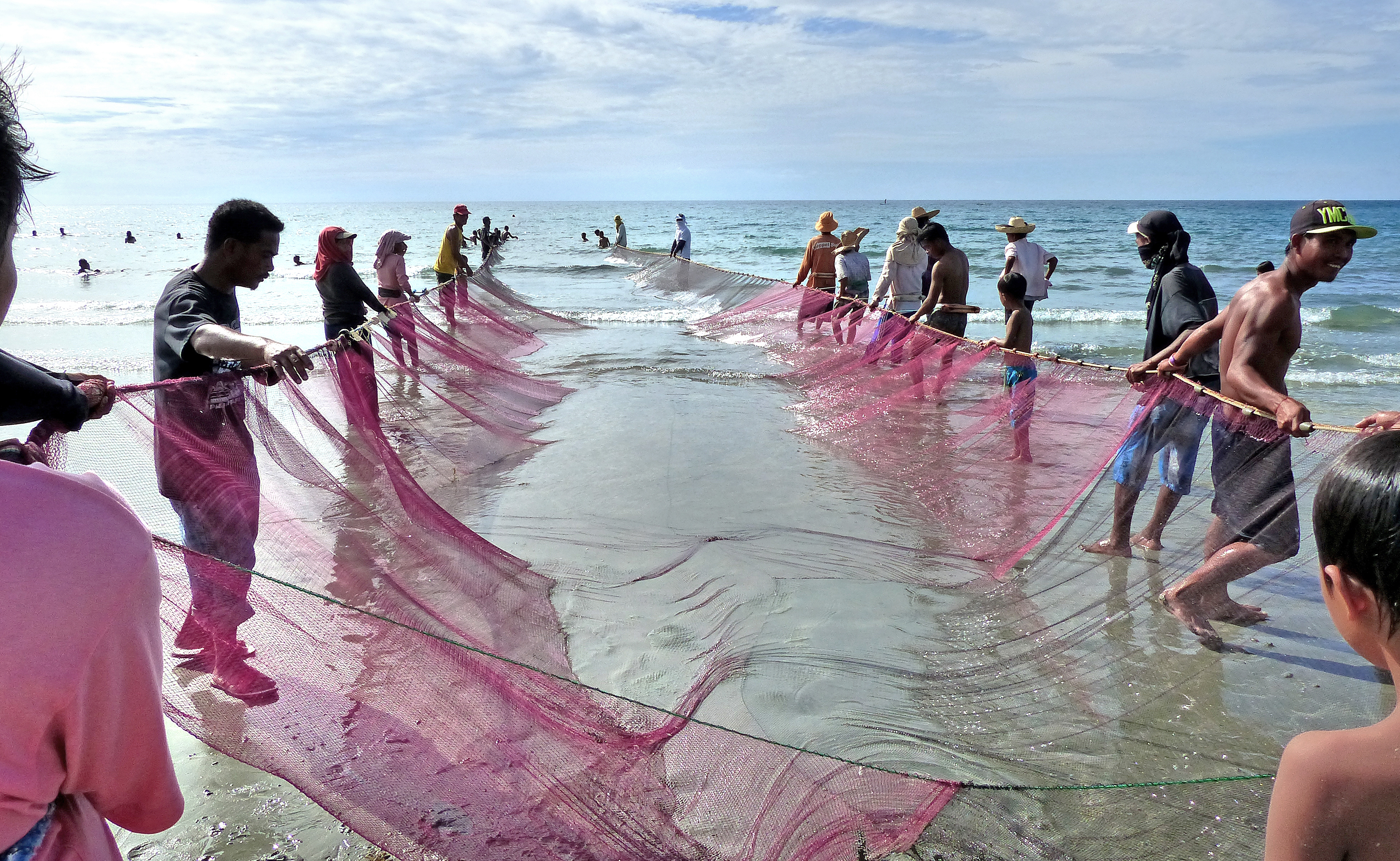
Fishing

Climate change also poses a threat to many communities within the Philippines that rely on small-scale fisheries for their food as well as for their livelihoods. Ocean acidification and coral bleaching from climate impacts have harmed coral reefs and in turn the fish that live in their ecosystems. Both coastal and inland fisheries are affected by droughts that disrupt their fishing schedules and floods that cause the sedimentation of ponds and destroy of their fishing equipment. People in the Philippines get about 43% of their animal protein from fish and fish products.

Along with production losses, climate change and natural disasters also exacerbate income and health disparities related to food. Price inflation with limited production make food inaccessible and unaffordable to families with less income in both rural and urban areas. Two-thirds of low income people in the Philippines rely on agriculture to make a living, and their ability to provide for themselves and their families are increasingly at risk. In coastal areas most vulnerable to climate change, increased threats to families' livelihoods contributed to greater food insecurity and child malnutrition outcomes. In a survey across 17 regions, child development due to malnutrition occurred at high rates of stunting, at 33 percent, and wasting, at 6 percent.

== Water ==
Water security is a basic need for people to live a healthy and active lifestyle, and water is recognized as a basic human right by UNICEF and the World Health Organization. Having access to potable water is essential for human health, and people can only survive without water for 3 or 4 days. The water supply in the Philippines is threatened by climate change, as changes in rainfall patterns with heavy rainfall or drought make water harder to secure and flooding contaminates what would be safe drinking water. Changing weather patterns have led to trends of decreased inflow into major water reservoirs such as Lake Lanao, Pantabangan, Ambuklao, and Magat. Droughts and the reduction of water into these reservoirs have serious impacts on the people who rely on them as a main source of water, for example Manila and its surrounding area rely on the Angat Watershed for the majority of its water supply. Urban areas in the Philippines are more likely to experience water shortages because of the high demand of their large populations with dwindling water supply. On the other hand, coastal areas more prone to flooding deal with damage to water infrastructure and the spread of pollutants into water. Along with flooding, rising sea levels lead to saltwater intrusion into freshwater supplies, making water undrinkable. By 2040, between 40 and 80 percent of the Philippine's total water supply is estimated to be depleted, with water scarcity posing a serious threat to population health.

Changes in rainfall and increasing temperatures also lead to issues with irrigation water supply for crop production. Diversion water requirements to meet crop needs can increase up to a half due to climate change. An increased requirement for water coupled with an inadequate supply of water to support crop growth contributes to greater food insecurity in the Philippines.

== Climate-sensitive diseases and illnesses ==
Virulent infections in the Philippines are highly sensitive to climate change, as factors such as temperature, rainfall, and humidity promote longer life cycles of vectors and other infectious agents. Risk of food and water-borne disease also increases with flooding that disrupts water management and causes sanitation issues. Rising temperatures are also putting individuals at risk of heat stroke and other heat-related illness.

=== Water-borne diseases and sanitation issues ===
Water-borne diseases are transmitted through water and foods such as seafood, fruits, and vegetables. Increasing temperatures and changes to rainfall patterns leading to water contamination affect the incubation and spread of viruses and bacteria in water. Cholera cases rise notably with changes to weather, increasing by 26 per 1,000 cases for every unit of monthly rainfall, by 662 per 1,000 cases for every unit of increased humidity, and by nearly 8 per 1,000 cases for every unit of maximum temperature. Greater rainfall also increases vulnerability to diarrhea. Diarrhea is commonly transmitted through the fecal-oral route due to contact with contaminated food, water, and environment. Water pollution from flooding exacerbates disease by disrupting sanitation. Inadequate sewage management and unsanitary conditions lead to the transmission of infectious disease as people indirectly consume human feces through contaminated food or water. Rural and urban areas lacking clean or adequate amounts of water are at greater risk of diarrhea and cholera. Following natural disasters, in overcrowded evacuation areas, sanitary lavatories and clean water are often in short supply, making it more likely for people to develop diseases like diarrhea, cholera, and skin problems. In 2015, following the country's progress toward its Sustainable Development Goal, about 26% of the population in the Philippines still did not have access to improved sanitation facilities and 8% had no access to improved water sources. The government water supply and sanitation program estimated that diseases related to poor sanitation, water quality, and hygiene caused about 15,000 deaths per year in the Philippines.

=== Vector-borne diseases ===
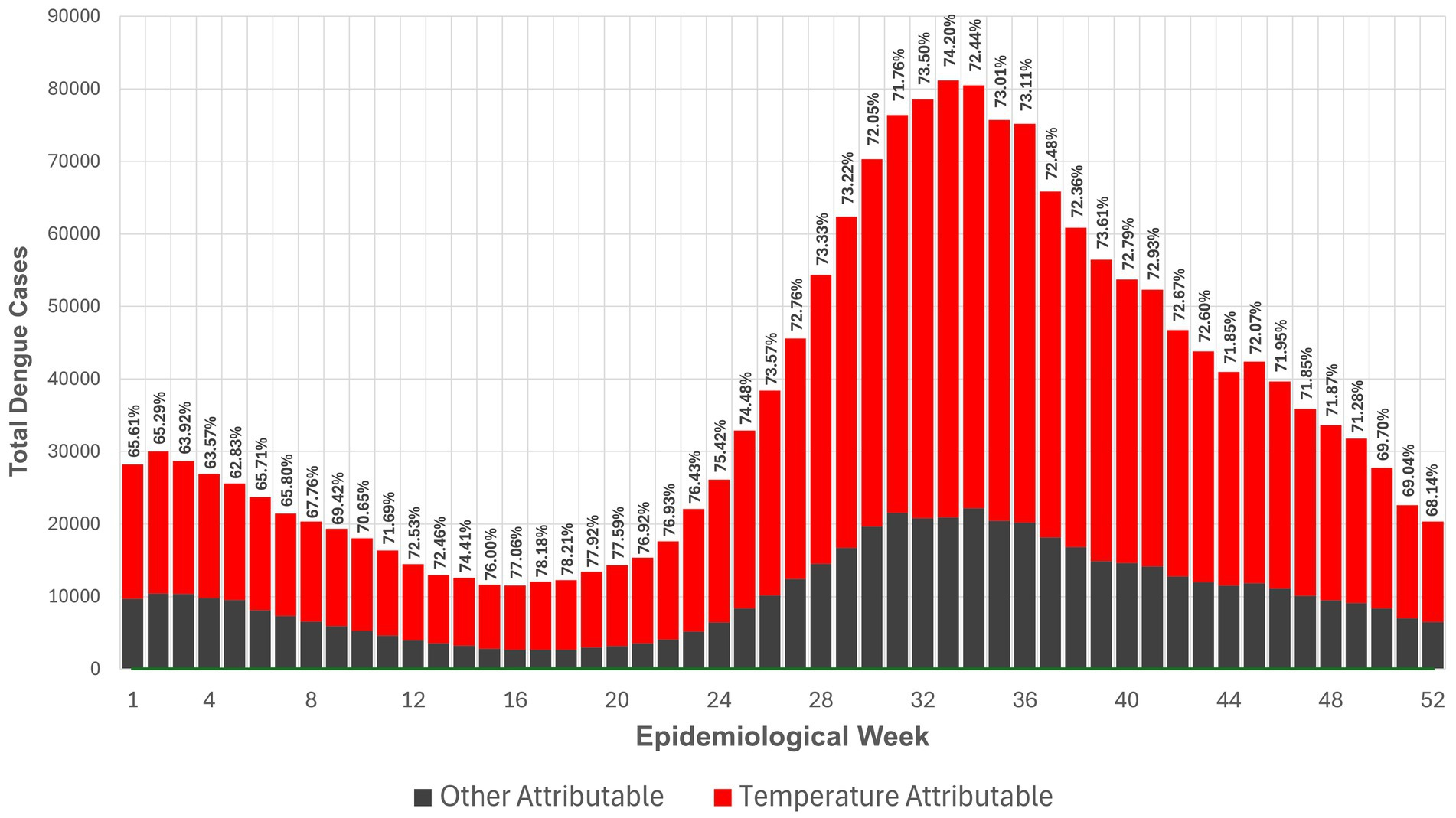
Percentage of temperature attributable dengue cases in 2010-2019

Vector-borne disease outbreaks have worsened as an effect of climate change. One of the most common vector-borne diseases in the Philippines is dengue fever, a disease transmitted by Aedes aegyti and Ae. albopictus female mosquitoes. Both dengue and malaria case incidents have a positive association with temperature increases. Hotter temperatures promotes the reproductive and biting rates of mosquitos as well as the incubation of dengue. Many studies have found a strong correlation between heavy rainfall and greater incidence of dengue in the Philippines as well. Stagnant water from flooding provides breeding grounds for vectors, leading to the growth of more mosquitos that transmit diseases. Following El Niño in 2015, there was a 60 percent increase in the number of dengue cases. Dengue fever continues to be endemic in the Philippines, and its transmission continues to increase. In 2022, there were 220,705 reported cases, with incidence increasing by 94% during the first quarter of 2023. The World Health Organization projects that by 2070, under both high and low emissions scenarios, dengue fever transmission in the Philippines will remain at a high transmission level and over 150 million new people will be at risk of malaria.

=== Heat-related illness and mortality ===
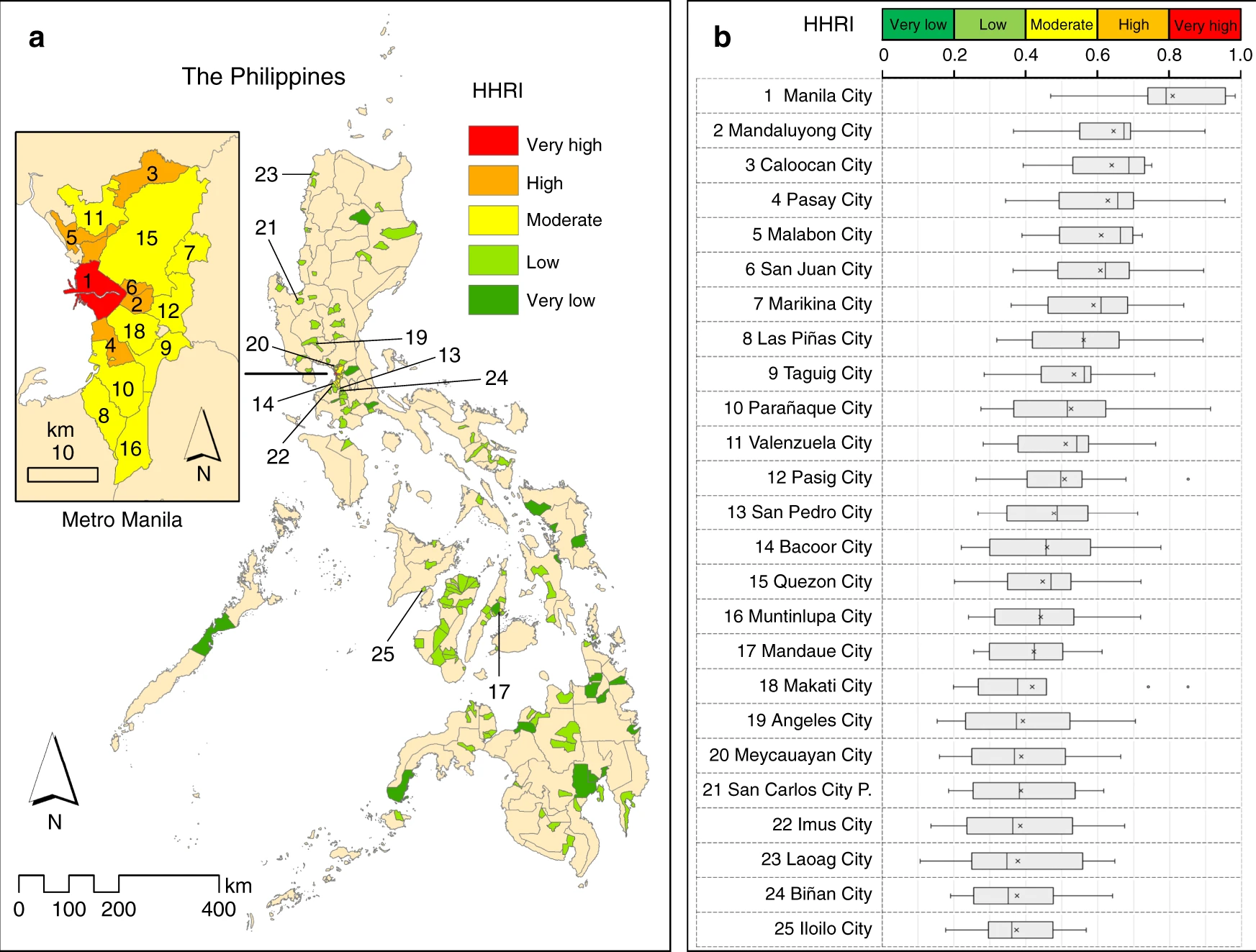
Heat Health Risk Index for major cities in the Philippines (2015)

As the average annual temperature and the intensity and frequency of heat waves both increase in the Philippines, more people are at risk of heat-related illness and mortality, particularly in the elderly, children, and people who are chronically ill. According to the Philippine Department of Health, temperatures 33–41 degrees Celsius are classified as "extreme caution" levels, 42–51 degrees Celsius are classified as "dangerous_{,}" and temperatures of 52 degrees Celsius and above are classified as "extreme danger" with high risk of heat stroke. Temperatures across the Philippines are exceeding previous heat records, and in 2024, a heat spike in Manila reached 38.8 degrees Celsius with a heat index of 45 degrees Celsius with high humidity. Extreme heat heightens the risk of heat exhaustion and heat stroke and can lead to other medical issues such as dizziness, fainting, dehydration, and kidney failure. Exposure to extreme heat are linked with increased risks of cardiovascular and respiratory disease. People living in urban areas have greater health risks associated with heat due to the urban heat island effect, being twice as exposed to heat increases as people in rural areas due to factors like reduced ventilation and heat absorbing surfaces. In the Philippines, 45% of people live in urban areas, and the urban population is rapidly increasing. Overly-populated areas in large cities are experiencing heat stress that is exacerbated by climate change. Heat is also a large occupational health hazard in the Philippines for outdoor and manual workers, with potential harms such as heat exhaustion or heat stroke.

== Mental health ==
Climate-related disasters and events have taken a large toll on the mental health of people living in the Philippines. While the country includes mental health as a pillar in its National Unified Health Research Agenda 2017–2022, mental health consequences of extreme weather changes and natural disasters are less of a priority compared to other health issues. The mental healthcare system in the Philippines is smaller than other sectors, as only 3-5% of the Philippine government health budget is spent on mental health and there are very limited psychiatrists and mental health workers per portion of the population.

Natural disasters caused PTSD and stress disorders to individuals as well as insomnia and intrusive thoughts related to their traumatic experiences. Shifts in climate such as rising sea levels, modification of land, and changes to freshwater contributing to food and water insecurity also are linked with increased rates of depression and anxiety. Following Super Typhoon Haiyan in 2013, one of the strongest typhoons in history, the demand for psychological healthcare tripled as people's communities, livelihoods, and families were devastated. Rates of PTSD and depression increased among the population, and 80.5% of survivors who helped with typhoon relief response were found to be at risk of mental illness in a study done 4 months later.

Mental health risks associated with climate change particularly impact younger people. The Philippines had the highest number of young people experiencing anxiety and negative emotions surrounding climate events in 2022. People who are forced to relocate due to climate impacts also face specific mental health challenges, losing their sense of identity, place, and belonging. Some climate migrants move to informal settlements in new areas for better economic opportunities, but face risks of abuse, violence, and other mental health disorders upon moving.

== Population displacement ==
There are about 20 tropical storms in the Philippines annually, and frequent weather-related events such as typhoons and floods result in major and sustained population displacement. Loss of coastal land due to sea levels rising also cause permanent population displacement. An average of 3.7 million people a year were displaced by climate impacts between 2008 and 2017. Typhoon Haiyan alone, one of the largest natural disasters, resulted in the displacement of approximately 200,000 people. Driving factors for displacement due to weather-related events are poverty, rapid urbanization, and poor zoning regulations.

Many displaced peoples live in unstable housing such as temporary shelters. Following disasters, shelters used to accommodate displaced peoples often lack adequate sanitation facilities, raising the risk of communicable disease. Communicable diseases caused by a disruption of living conditions have the largest post-disaster health impact compared to injuries and noncommunicable diseases. Additionally, displaced survivors often have limited access to health care to address pre-existing or new conditions following climate events, making them more likely to suffer from both chronic and acute health issues, such as cardiovascular issues, back pain, and oral health problems.

== Impact on health systems ==
Health system vulnerability and the lack of basic needs such as shelter, water, sanitation, and health services following climate events lead to higher disease transmission and morbidity rates. Natural disasters bear a heavy cost to the Philippines. From 2010 to 2015, there were 96 climate-related disasters, including 51 storms, 44 floods, and a major drought. These climate disasters affected an average of 11 million people per year and their resulting damage to property, crops, and livestock totaled to an estimated 750 billion pesos. Damage due to storms to hospitals and healthcare systems also worsen health outcomes as people are unable to receive care for their medical needs. Super Typhoon Rai in 2021, damaged 41 percent of village healthcare stations and 28 percent of hospitals across 11 regions of the Philippines, making healthcare systems unable to help communities and contributing to greater injury and death with the lack of healthcare service.

Mental health care has been adversely affected by the impacts of climate change as well. In Eastern Visayas, which was critically hit by Super Typhoon Haiyan in 2013, its regional hospital was severely damaged, leaving hundreds of thousands of people without psychological services.

== Effects on specific groups ==
=== Children ===
Children are at increased risk to the effects of climate change as they are still developing and their immune systems are still maturing, making them more vulnerable to climate-related hazards like heat and communicable diseases. Rising temperatures and increased rainfall causing crop failures and subsequent rises in food prices have exacerbated child malnutrition in the Philippines. The development of children, including brain development, is strongly tied to their ability to access nutritious food and the health of their lungs and immune system are heavily impacted by the negative changes to their environment. In children under the age of 5, the most common health issues due to climate-related events in the Philippines are acute respiratory infection, acute watery diarrhea, open wounds, high blood pressure, and fever. Children are particularly vulnerable to water scarcity, as only 45 percent of school-aged children in the Philippines have access to an adequate water source with a ready supply of water in school and another 26 percent of school-aged children drink water from unimproved sources or have no access to water in school.

=== Women ===
Women often suffer a greater burden from climate-related events such as flooding, as they are most likely to have raised workloads related to household chores and childcare. Water scarcity in the Philippines adds more time to women's work as they walk longer distances to obtain drinking water for their families. The effects of floods and droughts on crop production also disproportionately harms female farmers, who are more likely to fall into long-term debt because they are loaned greater microcredits that become difficult to repay with crop failures. Moreover, women most often prioritize their children and other household members over themselves, choosing not to eat during food shortages or times of low harvest. Malnutrition due to climate change as well as greater incidents of diseases such as dengue and malaria have large impacts on maternal mortality, poor reproductive health, and infant health risks such as low birth weight.

=== LGBTQ+ community ===
LGBTQ+ individuals in the Philippines are particularly vulnerable to adverse health effects from climate change because they face additional barriers to accessing resources. LGBTQ+ Filipinos face discrimination following climate-related events. Many individuals reported being denied social services due to their sexual orientation and gender identities, being deprived of housing or food support during typhoon relief efforts. Same-sex couples reported being denied family resources because their status as a "family" was not recognized. Additionally, LGBTQ+ individuals in the Philippines experience multiple forms of marginalization that exacerbate health disparities from climate-related events, having less access to healthcare and health insurance and having less social support that can aggravate mental health issues and stress response.

=== Lower income individuals ===
Extreme weather and climate events are poverty multipliers, pushing individuals further below the poverty threshold by disrupting agricultural productivity and raising the prices of staple foods, putting stress on lower income individuals. Poverty rates in the Philippines remains highest in rural areas, where many people rely on agriculture and fishing as a source of income. Many people with lower income do not have access to basic sanitation facilities and clean drinking water, relying instead on free water like springs and creeks that are increasingly contaminated, which heightens their risk of water-borne diseases. People living in poverty are also more likely to be displaced by climate crises, and as displaced peoples face increased communicable disease risk and greater mental distress.

== Coping and adaptation ==
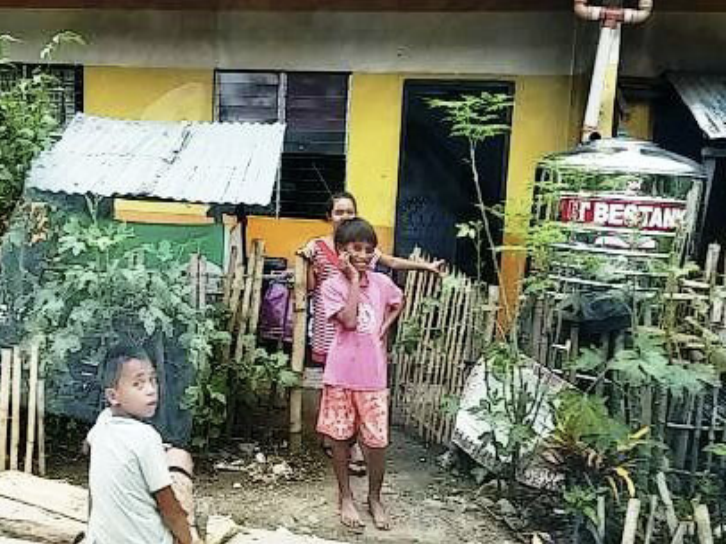
Example of a rainwater collection tank provided by NGOs in the Philippines

For more information, see Climate change adaptation in the Philippines.

Adaptation to climate change and its health effects involves collaborative and multi-level interventions from governments, NGOs, industries, communities, and individual households. The Philippines has created and implemented several policies addressing climate change, including the Climate Change Act of 2009, the National Climate Change Action Plan 2011–2028, and the Philippine Development Plan 2023–2028. In 2023, the Climate Change Commission, the Philippines' lead government body on climate change resilience, and the Philippine Red Cross agreed to conduct community risk profiling and mitigation planning and to fund climate initiatives to protect the health of local communities. The Philippine Red Cross provides health and social services following climate disasters. It also works to raise awareness of health hazards due to climate change and develops strategies to prevent health risks. At a community level, individuals build their local coping and adaptive capacity by understanding their community's vulnerabilities, better connecting people to local health resources, and mobilizing local people to help on long-term disaster management projects with the Red Cross. The Department of Agriculture manages new technologies, such as the Philippine Rice Information System that tracks weather patterns and crop growth to helps farmers adapt to changing weather to hopefully promote greater food production.

== See also ==
- Effects of climate change on human health
- Climate change in the Philippines
- Health in the Philippines
- Water supply and sanitation in the Philippines
- Poverty in the Philippines
- Effects of climate change on health in the United Kingdom
