= Albert Dela Cruz =

Filipino politician

Commissioner of the Climate Change Commission of the Philippines
- Incumbent
- Assumed office October 2022

Undersecretary of the Department of Human Settlements and Urban Development
- In office August 2021 – October 2022

Vice Mayor of Mexico, Pampanga
- In office 1998–2001

Member of the Sangguniang Bayan of Mexico, Pampanga
- In office 1995–1998

Personal details
- Born: October 6, 1972 (age 53) Mexico, Pampanga, Philippines
- Education: Angeles University Foundation (BS); Harvardian Colleges (LLB)
- Occupation: Public official, environmental planner

Albert Dela Cruz (born October 6, 1972) is a Filipino public official who serves as a Commissioner of the Climate Change Commission of the Philippines (CCC). In this role, he coordinates national climate governance, environmental policy, and engagement with local government units (LGUs), academic institutions, and civil society.

== Early life and education ==
Dela Cruz was born on October 6, 1972, in Mexico, Pampanga, Philippines. He earned a Bachelor of Science in Biology from Angeles University Foundation and a Bachelor of Law from Harvardian Colleges.

He pursued graduate-level studies including coursework toward a Master in Business Administration at Ateneo de Clark University and a Master in Environmental Planning at Philippine Christian University. He is a registered environmental planner and a registered occupational safety and health practitioner in the Philippines.

== Career ==
=== Local government ===
Dela Cruz began his public service career in the Municipality of Mexico, Pampanga, serving as a member of the Sangguniang Bayan (municipal councilor) from 1995 to 1998 and as Municipal Vice Mayor from 1998 to 2001.

=== National government service ===
Dela Cruz served as Undersecretary for Operations at the Department of Human Settlements and Urban Development (DHSUD), where he focused on housing policy and disaster-resilient urban development. He has also held board-level roles in the Philippine National Oil Company and its renewable energy subsidiary.

=== Climate Change Commission ===
As a Commissioner of the CCC, Dela Cruz oversees the evaluation of national climate change programs. His work includes policy discussions on the People's Survival Fund and climate financing mechanisms.

He has advocated for "edible landscaping" as a community-based adaptation strategy and has engaged municipal leaders through climate summits and courtesy visits to strengthen localized governance. In 2023, he was named a "Clean Air Champion" for his environmental advocacy.
