= Bataan Rice Enrichment Project =

Bataan Rice Enrichment Project or the Bataan Experiment, was a collaborative research venture between American chemist Robert R. Williams and Juan Salcedo Jr. It was a series of feeding experiments conducted in municipalities in Bataan between 1947 and 1949. By the end of the experiments, it is shown that thiamine-enriched rice can reduce the cases of beriberi in the Philippines, which was the leading cause of deaths during those times.

== Overview ==
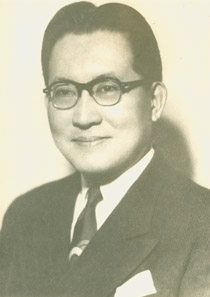
Juan Salcedo Jr., lead researcher during the Bataan Experiment

The enrichment project came first as a plan in 1943. During this time, Salcedo, who had his studies at Columbia University, met American chemist Robert R. Williams, a well renowned scientist for his synthesis on vitamin B1 in 1935.

In 1943 I met Dr. Juan Salcedo, Jr. in New York and nearby on two or more occasions and talked with him at length about the possibility of a substantial effort to combat beriberi in the Philippines by means of the artificial enrichment of rice ... In spite of these anxieties he was much interested in the possibility of an attack on beriberi in the Philippines and together we laid out rough plans for the undertaking to be staged when the Philippines should be released from Japanese control.

–Robert R. Williams, The Bataan Experiment and Present Status Of Beriberi in the Philippines

The Philippine Bureau of Health reported a relatively stable beriberi rate from the mid-1920s to 1940. However, after World War II, beriberi cases surged, becoming the second leading cause of death in 1946 and 1947. Infants accounted for a significant portion of these deaths.

At this time, Williams was disappointed by the agencies at the United Nations to further eradicate the rise of beriberi cases around the globe. Due to his previous failures in rice enrichment programs, Williams became desperate. Together with Salcedo, they began feeding experiments in the province of Bataan.

The specific objectives of the feeding experiment were:

- Determine if enriched rice could effectively treat beriberi.
- Test the practicality of using enriched rice in the rice trade.
- Establish a system to ensure only enriched rice is sold.
- Promote the use of enriched rice among the people and explore its potential for widespread use throughout the Philippines.

The experiments were conducted in Bataan where it was divided into two areas: the experimental zone and control zone. After the introduction of thiamine-enriched rice, the experimental area received significant results. Mortality rate in beriberi significantly decreased after the introduction of the nutrient-enriched white rice from July 1, 1948, to June 30, 1950. Before the introduction, there occurred 167 deaths from beriberi cases from July 1, 1947, to June 30, 1948. It decreased further to just 18 deaths after the introduction.

== Human rights concerns ==
Williams intentionally exposed half of Bataan's food-deficient population to beriberi, replicating the unethical experiments conducted by Euro-American researchers on prisoners and asylum patients. He also recreated prison camps and asylums to further persuade unwilling participants. This act, unfortunately, was seen as a form of colonial exploitation by both the Filipino people and nationalist physicians, who recognized beriberi as a symptom of the colonial system.

The control group used for the feeding experiments were also denied of access from the enriched rice. This resulted an unwanted exposure of beriberi among research participants.

== Reception and aftermath ==
Due to positive results from the experiment, in 1950, both Williams and Salcedo planned to expand the rice enrichment project throughout the Philippines. However, this was met by opposition from the Philippine government despite insistence from Williams. During the 1950s, it was further delayed by the Hukbalahap rebellion.

From then on, the government stopped subsidizing the project entirely and had to rely from funding by Williams and supported by a team from the Food and Agriculture Organization (FAO). From 1966 to 1970, FAO sponsored the introduction of high-yielding rice varieties into the Philippines. According to a 1971 report by FAO, the implementation of the rice enrichment projects in the Philippines, Taiwan, and Japan showed the "conflicting economic interests of millers, governments and consumers".
