= Juan Salcedo Jr. =

Secretary of the Philippine Department of Health

Juan S. Salcedo Jr ONS
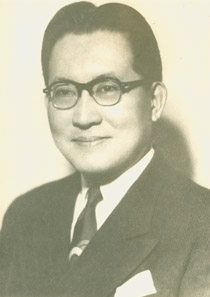
- Official portrait, National Academy of Science and Technology

8th Secretary of Health
- In office December 14, 1950 – May 1954
- President: Elpidio Quirino; Ramon Magsaysay
- Preceded by: Antonio Villarama
- Succeeded by: Paulino Garcia

Personal details
- Born: September 23, 1904 Pasay, Rizal, Philippine Islands
- Died: October 25, 1988 (aged 84)
- Education: University of the Philippines Manila; Columbia University
- Awards: Order of National Scientists of the Philippines (1978)

Juan Sanchez Salcedo Jr. (September 23, 1904 – October 25, 1988) was a Filipino physician and scientist who specialized in biochemistry, nutrition and public health. He was secretary of health from 1950 to 1953 and chairman of the National Science Development Board (now reorganized as the Department of Science and Technology) from 1962 to 1970. He was also one of the original board of trustees and incorporators of the Philippine Rural Reconstruction Movement. Following his government service, he became dean of the University of the East Medical College and president of Araneta University.

His involvement in nutrition began with the Bataan Experiment, where he led surveys and experiments in Bataan to prove that enriching rice with thiamine and other nutrients such as iron can cure beriberi, which was the leading cause of deaths in the Philippines during those times.

As the secretary of health, he enacted the mandatory National Rice Enrichment Act 832 for the prevention of beriberi cases, but was met with backlash from rice millers and poor enforcement from authorities.

== Education and early career ==
Juan Salcedo Jr. was born on September 23, 1904 (Note: Other sources claimed he was born on September 29, 1904. For the sake of accuracy, the article followed a 1967 publication of his biography, at a time when the person in question was still alive. September 23 is also the birth date given by the Nutrition Foundation of the Philippines, Inc., an organization founded by Salcedo.) to Juan Salcedo Sr. and Felipa Sanchez. At a young age, he attended Paco Intermediate School and graduated salutatorian. In high school, he attended Manila South High School. In 1929, he graduated at U.P. College of Medicine. From 1929 to 1936, he worked as a physiology instructor at UP.

In 1943, during the Pacific War, he studied at Columbia University. There he met Robert R. Williams, who, in 1935, had synthesized vitamin B1. They created a plan together in 1943 to combat beriberi in the Philippines which was later known as the "Bataan Rice Enrichment Project". This plan, however, cannot be executed until the defeat of Japan in 1945.

During his time as a director for field operations of USPHS and founding father of the Philippine Association of Nutrition, Salcedo wanted a state agency dedicated solely for nutrition. In 1948, President Manuel Roxas' administration appointed him as chairperson for the state-created Institute of Nutrition.

== Scientific contributions ==
=== The Bataan Experiment ===
In 1946, beriberi was the second leading cause of death in the Philippines, following tuberculosis.

In 1948, the survey, led by Dr. Juan Salcedo, Jr. and a team including Dr. M. D. Bamba and three other medical officers, aimed to assess beriberi in the Philippines. They surveyed approximately 22% of the population in the experimental zone and 2 out of 5 control municipality in Bataan, examining 1,000 to 2,500 individuals per municipality. Findings revealed that beriberi cases were uniformly distributed across different age and physiological groups, affecting 12.8% of those examined, with mortality highest in infants. Sex did not notably influence results, except for physiological conditions related to pregnancy and lactation. Since October 1948, Salcedo, along with Bamba's team tested their enriched rice for exclusive use by 63,000 people in Bataan. The findings shows a decline of 76 to 94% in the incidence of beriberi in each of 7 municipalities.

From 1947 to 1949, feeding experiments in Bataan were conducted by American chemist Robert R. Williams and Salcedo. The experiments showed that thiamine-enriched polished white rice significantly decreased beriberi rates among at-risk populations. Salcedo was credited as the developer of a rice variety fortified with thiamine which helped reduce the cases of beriberi in the Philippines and in other countries.

In 1949, Salcedo, along with Alfonso Pedroche, Elpedio C. Panganiban and Jose F. De Leon, conducted preliminary field trials in the Philippines involving artificially enriched white rice with 3,500 participants. The results were completely satisfactory. In limited observations, some members of the Armed Forces of the Philippines, who were participants for the trials, received beneficial effects on peripheral neuritis.

=== Other publications and researches ===
Here are some of the notable publications and researches by Salcedo:

==== Medical Services ====
- Salcedo, J. S. Jr., (1949 Ja - Mr ) The role of nurses in the national nutrition program, Filipino Nurse Volume 18/3
- Salcedo, J. S. Jr., (1949 Mr) The medical practitioner and our nutrition problems, Philippine Medical World Volume 4/3
- Salcedo, J. S. Jr., (1949 Ap ) The publlc health approach to our nutrition problems, Journal of the Philippine Medical Association Volume 25/4

==== Nutrition ====
- Salcedo, J. S. Jr., (1943) Studies on vitamin A deficiency. I. Dark adaption test in 997 cases, Abstracts of Scientific Papers Presented before the Conference on Medical Sciences in Commemoration of the Establishment of the Republic of the Philippines
- Salcedo, J, S. Jr., et.al., (1944 N) The source of the extra liver fat in various types of fatty liver, Journal of the Biological Chemistry Volume 156/1
- Salcedo, J. S. Jr., (1937 F) Studies on the pulse rates and blood pressures of the male Filipino Olympic athletes of 1934, National Research Council of the Philippine Islands.

== Recognition ==
=== Public service ===
By 1950, his publications was cited by numerous scientific papers, reviews and textbooks. This recognition of his works led to his appointment as the Secretary of Health by Philippine President Elpidio Quirino from 1950 to 1953. He was appointed Chairman of the National Science Development Board, now the Department of Science and Technology, from 1962 to 1965 by President Diosdado Macapagal, and reappointed under President Ferdinand Marcos, Sr. from 1966 to 1970.

=== Awards and other recognitions ===
He was given the highest award to a Filipino citizen namely the 1966 Republic Cultural Heritage Award in Science and the 1969 Presidential Pro Patria Award. In 1978, he was named a National Scientist. He was also named “Scientist Par Excellence and Scholar Meritissimus” by the International Academy of Leadership in 1969.

He received the William J. Gies Fellow in Biochemistry at Columbia University, and was President of the 5th World Health Organization Assembly. He also served as First Vice-Chairman at the UNICEF Conference on Children and Youth in National Planning and Development.

== As Health Secretary ==
In 1951, Salcedo extended rice enrichment to North Luzon, increasing rice prices slightly due to enrichment costs. Local ordinances banning unenriched rice were poorly enforced. As health secretary in 1952, Salcedo enacted National Rice Enrichment Act 832, making enrichment mandatory. This faced resistance from rice millers due to the additional cost and potential for increased tax scrutiny, as many small millers evaded taxes. Provincial millers formed a union to oppose the Act.

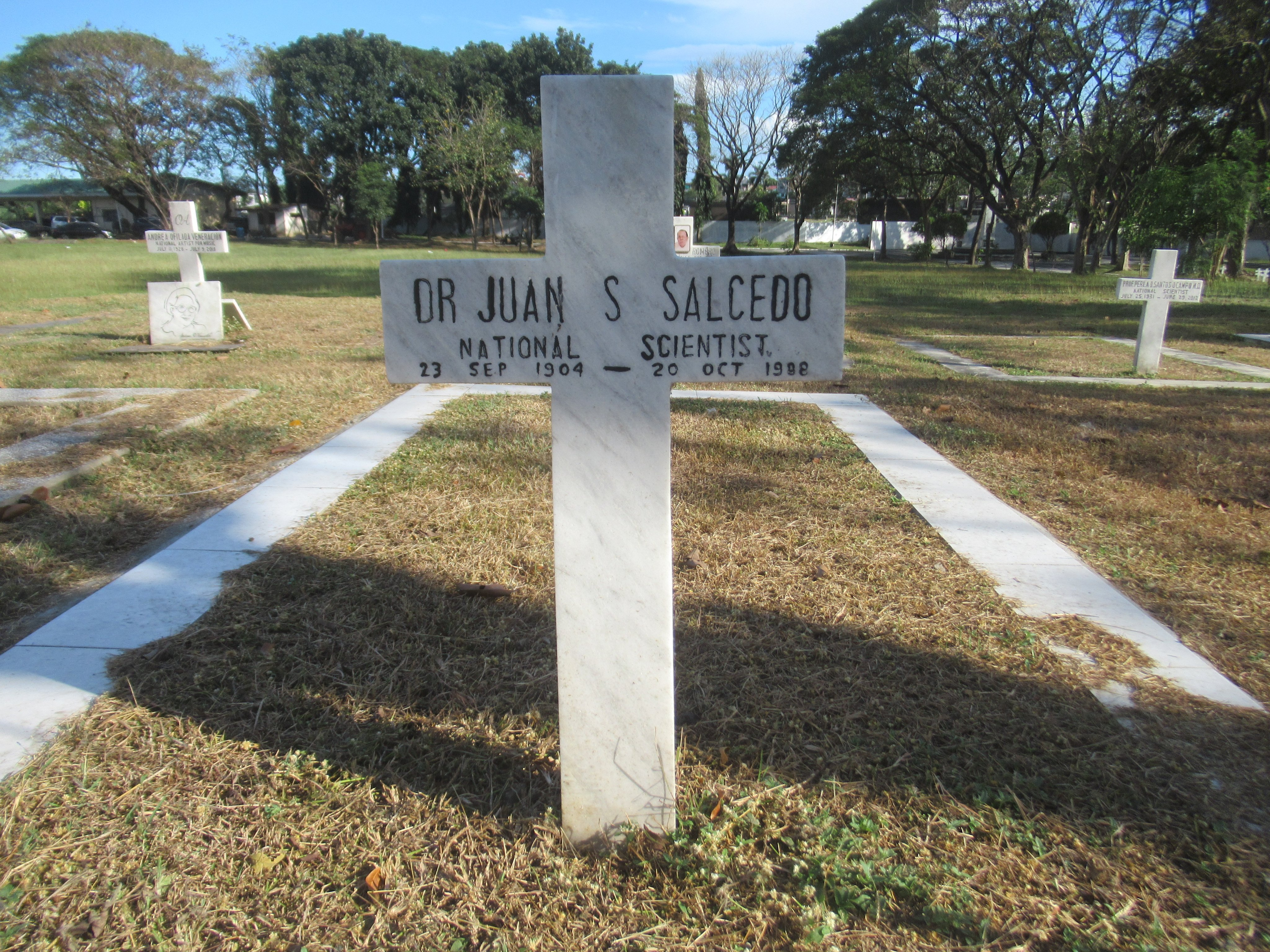
Salcedo, Jr's grave at the Libingan ng mga Bayani.

=== Lack of support from the government ===
In writing his biography, Salcedo recalls that President Ramon Magsaysay had promised support for rice enrichment but ultimately did not deliver. Magsaysay even sought to repeal the Rice Enrichment Act in 1955. Salcedo was disappointed by the law's lack of implementation. Before Magsaysay's death in March 1957, he planned a national conference to address issues with the rice enrichment program. His successor, Carlos P. Garcia, established a committee to study the act's implementation, but its work was delayed and eventually stalled due to opposition and lobbying from influential rice millers.

== See also ==
- Nutrition Foundation of the Philippines, Inc., a Philippine non-profit organization that Salcedo Jr. founded
