= Nationwide smoking ban order (Philippines) =

Executive Order No. 26

Executive Order No. 26
- Long title: Providing for the Establishment of Smoke-Free Environments in Public and Enclosed Places
- Citation: Executive Order No. 26, s. 2017
- Territorial extent: Philippines
- Signed by: Rodrigo Duterte
- Signed: May 16, 2017
- Commenced: July 23, 2017

Keywords
- smoking ban, tobacco control, health
- Status: In force

Executive Order No. 26, entitled Providing for the Establishment of Smoke-Free Environments in Public and Enclosed Places, was issued by Philippine President Rodrigo Duterte on May 16, 2017. This executive order invoked the Clean Air Act of 1999 and the Tobacco Regulation Act of 2003 to impose a nationwide ban on smoking in all public places in the Philippines. The ban replicates on a national level an existing ordinance in Davao City that Duterte created as mayor in 2002. The order took effect on July 23, 2017, 60 days after its publication in a newspaper. The ban received support from anti-tobacco advocates and the Philippine Tobacco Institute supported regulation of public smoking. Smokers that were interviewed said they were prepared to try quitting in response to the stricter rules and penalties.

On 26 February 2020, President Duterte issued Executive Order No. 106, which amended Executive Order No. 26 to include and address electronic nicotine/non-nicotine delivery systems, heated tobacco products, and prohibited the manufacture, distribution, marketing, and sale of unregistered or adulterated products.

== Provisions ==
Section 3. Prohibited Acts, The following acts are declared unlawful and prohibited;

(a) Smoking within enclosed public places conveyances, whether stationary or in motion, except in DSAs fully compliant with the requirements of Section 4 of his Order;

(b) For persons-in-charge to allow, abet or tolerate smoking in places enumerated in the preceding paragraph, outside of DSAs fully compliant with Section 4 of this Order;

(c) For any person to sell, distribute or purchase tobacco products to and from minors. It shall not be a defense for the person selling or distributing that he/she did not know or was not aware of the real age of the minor. Neither shall it be a defense that he/she did not know nor had any reason to believe that the cigarette or any other tobacco product was for the consumption of the minor to whom it was sold;

(d) For a minor to smoke, sell or buy cigarettes or any tobacco products;

(e) Ordering, instructing or compelling a minor to use, light up, buy, sell, distribute, deliver, advertise or promote tobacco products;

(f) Selling or distributing tobacco products in a school, public playground, youth hostels and recreational facilities for minors, including those frequented by minors, or within 100 meters from any point of the perimeter of these places;

(g) Placing, posting, displaying or distributing advertisement and promotional materials of tobacco products, such as but not limited to leaflets, posters, display structures and other materials within 100 meters from the perimeter of a school, public playground, and other facilities frequented particularly by minors, hostel and recreational facilities for minors, including those frequented by them, or in an establishment when such establishments or its location is prohibited from selling tobacco products.

(h) Placing any form of tobacco advertisement outside of the premises of point-of-sale retail establishments; and

(i) Placing any stall, booth, and other displays concerning tobacco promotions to areas outside the premises of point-of-sale locations or adult-only facilities.

The order restricts and penalizes the act of smoking tobacco products in enclosed public places and public conveyances, whether stationary or in motion, except in certain designated smoking areas. It requires that all public buildings or places that are accessible or open to the public regardless of ownership or right to access must be smoke-free inside and within 10 meters (33 ft) from entrances and exits or where people pass or congregate, and from air intake ducts. This includes but is not limited to:

- Government buildings
- Schools, colleges and universities
- Offices and other workplaces
- Restaurants and other food and drink establishments
- Hotels and other accommodation facilities
- Hospitals, health centers, clinics and nursing homes
- Transportation terminals
- Churches
- Shopping centers, retail stores and other merchandise establishments
- Entertainment establishments
- Sports venues
- Other establishments that provide professional services

Public conveyances include buses and jeepneys, taxicabs, tricycles and other public utility vehicles, rail transit, airplanes and ships. The order also prohibits smoking in all outdoor spaces where people gather such as parks, playgrounds, sidewalks, waiting areas, open-air markets and resorts.

The order also covers existing bans on the sale, distribution and purchase of tobacco products to and from minors, or persons below 18 years old, as well as the restrictions on cigarette advertisements and promotions under the Tobacco Regulation Act. It also instructs all local government units to form a "Smoke Free Task Force" to help enforce its provisions.

In July 2019, the Department of the Interior and Local Government (DILG) issued Memorandum Circular 2019-98 as part of its efforts to sustain implementation of Executive Order No. 26 and encourage local governments to comply with smoke-free policies.

=== Penalties ===
The order imposes fines of up to ₱10,000 (US$200) for violation of the smoking ban in public places as prescribed in section 32 of the Tobacco Regulation Act. Enforcement can be performed by members of the Philippine National Police and the local task forces of each city and municipality.

- ₱500 – ₱1,000 for first offense
- ₱1,000 – ₱5,000 second offense
- ₱5,000 – ₱10,000 for the third offense plus revocation of business permit or license to operate of the violating establishment

Local enforcement has continued to rely on city ordinances and local enforcement. Davao City reported in 2024, that more than 6,000 people were apprehended for violating its anti-smoking ordinance with most having to pay a fine and charges were filed against those who did not.

=== Designated smoking areas ===
Section 4 of the EO details the standards required for designated smoking areas (DSA) in public places:

- DSAs shall have a combined area and buffer zone not larger than 20 percent of the total floor area of the building but not smaller than 10 meters (33 ft)
- DSAs shall have no opening that will allow air to escape to the smoke-free area of the building or conveyance
- DSAs shall have a ventilation system independent of other ventilation systems servicing the rest of the building or conveyance
- DSAs shall prominently display a "Smoking Area" signage, graphic health warnings, and prohibition on the entry of persons below 18 years old
- There shall only be one DSA per building or conveyance

The order also stipulates that no designated smoking areas shall be installed in all centers of youth activity such as playschools, preparatory schools, elementary schools, high schools, colleges and universities, youth hostels and recreational facilities for minors; elevators and stairwells; fire-hazard locations such as gas stations and storage areas for flammable liquids, gas, explosives or combustible materials; hospitals, health centers, medical, dental and optical clinics, nursing homes, dispensaries and laboratories; and food preparation areas.
