= Health in the Philippines =

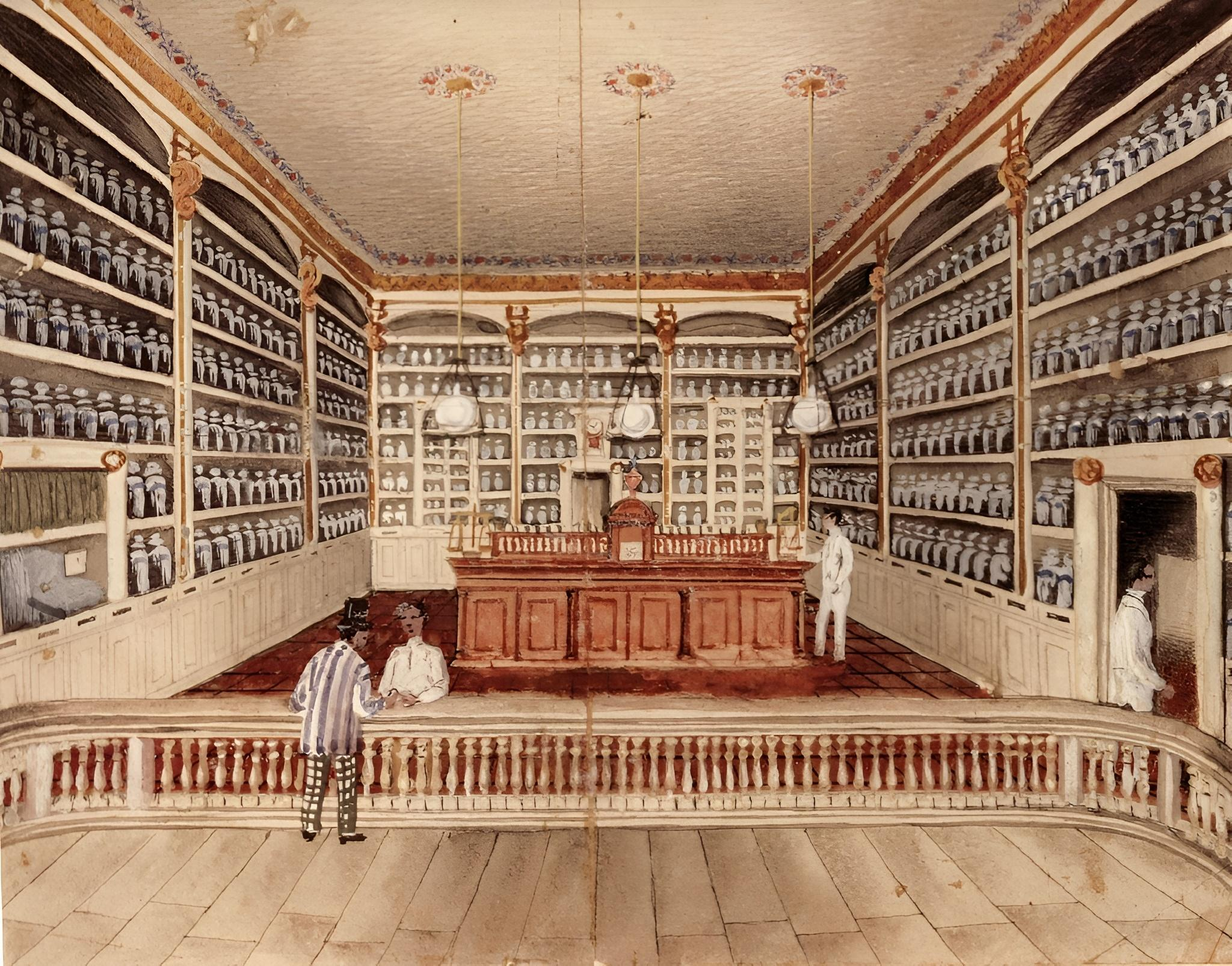
Botica Zobel was founded in 1834 by pharmacist Juan Andres Zobel in Calle Real, Intramuros.

Health in the Philippines is handled by the Government of the Philippines through its different offices with the Department of Health as the lead agency.

Access to healthcare services in the Philippines is marked by significant inequities, particularly affecting poor communities. These disparities are reflected in both access to services, health outcomes, and the effects of climate change which exacerbate the incidence of infectious diseases. One major challenge is the varying financing for local government units, leading to differences in the benefits packages of insurance plans and difficulties in accessing public health services. The decentralization of healthcare responsibilities from the federal government to local governments has, in some cases, increased local authority but has also made certain communities vulnerable to a lack of access to basic services.

In response to the Millennium Development Goals' focus on maternal and child health, the Philippines began the National Demographic and Health Survey in 1968 to assess the effectiveness of public health programs in the country.

== Statistics ==
=== Population ===
As of September 2020, the Philippines has a population of nearly 110 million and a population density of 368 per square kilometer. 32% of the population of the Philippines is under 15 years old, and only 22.2% is over 60. In the Philippines, 16.6% of the population lived below the national poverty line in 2018.

=== Live Births ===
Number and Percentage Change of Registered Live Births.

Year	Number	Percentage Change
2014	1.749M	
2015	1.745M	-0.2%
2016	1.731M	-0.8%
2017	1.701M	-1.8%
2018	1.668M	-1.9%
2019	1.674M	0.3%
2020	1.529M	-8.7%
2021	1.365M	-10.7%
2022	1.455M	6.5%
2023	1.449M	-0.5%

=== Health indicators ===
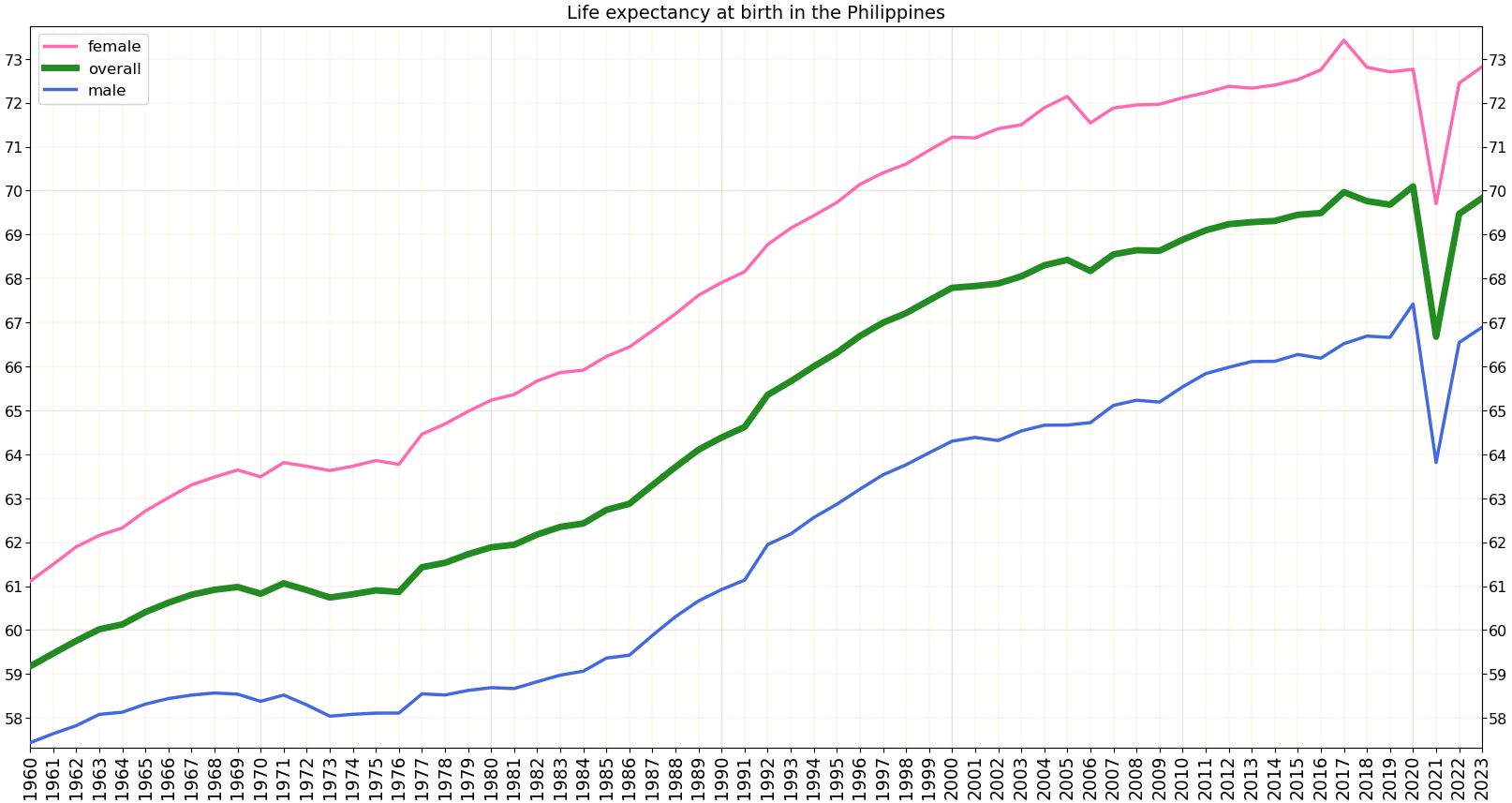
Life expectancy in the Philippines

Health Indicators	Male	Female	For Both Sexes
Life expectancy at birth (Years) 2016	66.2	72.6	
Under 5 mortality rate (Per 1,000 live births)			28.4
Maternal mortality rate (MMR) (Per 100,000 live births)		121	
Neonatal mortality rate (Per 1,000 live births)			13.5

== Nutrition ==
The National Nutrition Council (NCC) develops the Philippine Plan of Action for Nutrition (PPAN). The PPAN is released by the NCC since 1974 every six-years.

=== Stunting ===
In 2026 a study show that 1 in 4 Filipino children under 5 years old is stunted.

Stunting in children 0-5 years old.

Year	Percentage
1989	44.5%
1993	38.82%
1996	40%
1998	38.9%
2001	35.9%
2003	33.8%
2005	32.9%
2008	32.2%
2011	33.7%
2013	30.3%
2015	33.4%
2019	29.5%
2021	26.7%
2023	23.6%
2025	25.3%

== Health problems in the Philippines ==
The Philippines faces a large burden of disease:

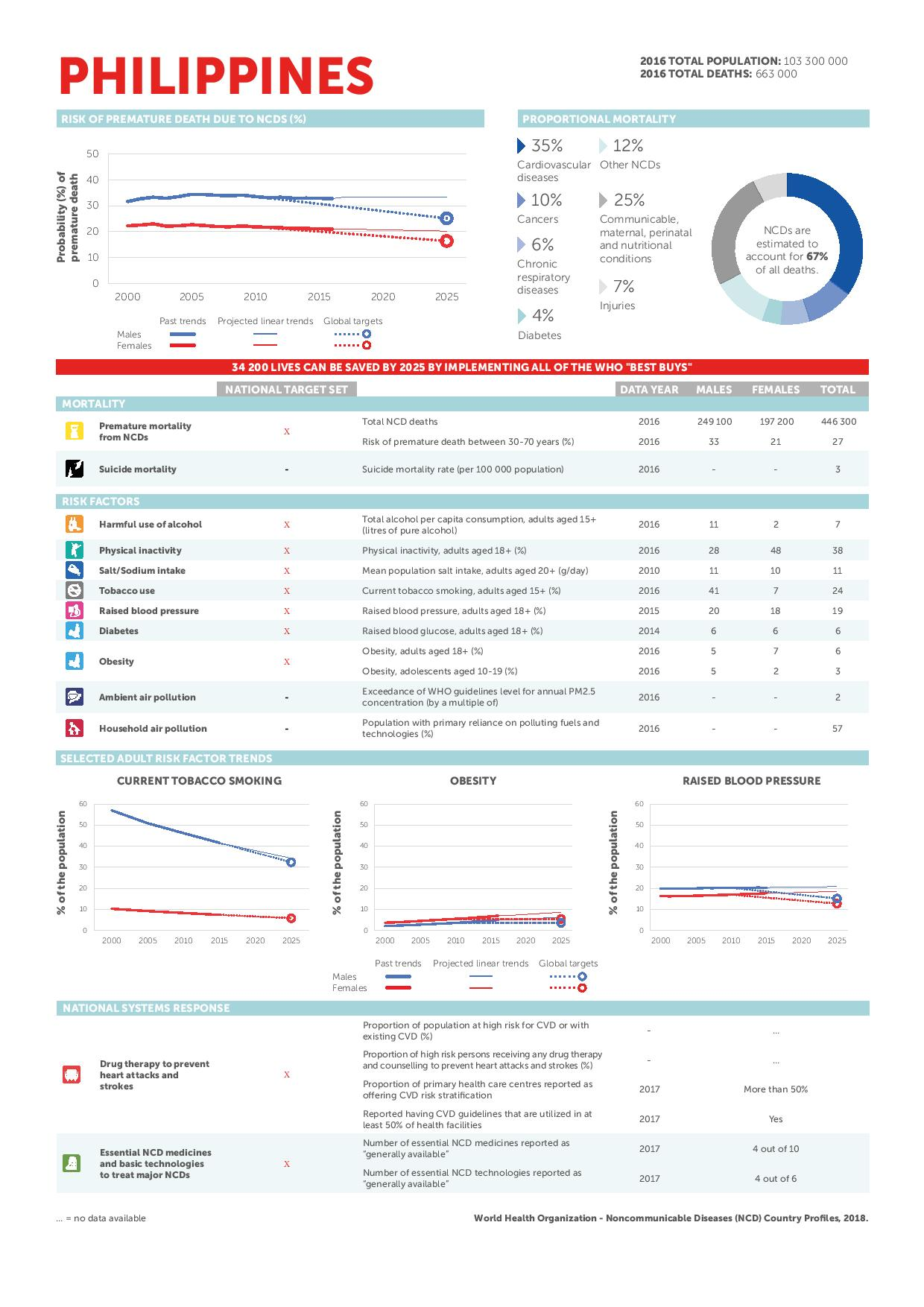
Proportional Death due to NCDs

The main non-communicable diseases are diabetes, heart disease, stroke, cancer, and chronic diseases that affect the airways and lungs. While these diseases affect different parts of the body in different ways, they often share common origins.

Communicable diseases: Acute Respiratory Infection, Influenza A (H1N1), Bird Flu (Avian Influenza), Chickenpox, Cholera, Dengue, Diarrhea, Hand, Foot, and Mouth Disease, Hepatitis A, Hepatitis B, Hepatitis C, HIV/AIDS, Influenza, Leprosy, Malaria, Measles, Meningococcemia, Pertussis, Poliomyelitis, Rabies, Severe Acute Respiratory Syndrome (SARS), Sore Eyes, Tuberculosis, Typhoid Fever

=== HIV/AIDS ===
The Philippines has one of the highest rates of infection of HIV/AIDS, and is one of the fastest growing number of cases worldwide. The Philippines is one of seven countries with growth in number of cases of over 25%, from 2001 to 2009.

Cases are concentrated among men who have sex with men. HIV cases among men having sex with men multiplied over 10 times since 2010. HIV cases are getting younger.

The first case of HIV infection in the Philippines was reported in January 1984.

In December 2018, the Philippine HIV and AIDS Policy Act of 2018, was passed. The law repealed the Philippine AIDS Prevention and Control Act of 1998, and made health services for HIV/AIDs more accessible to Filipinos.

=== Smoking ===
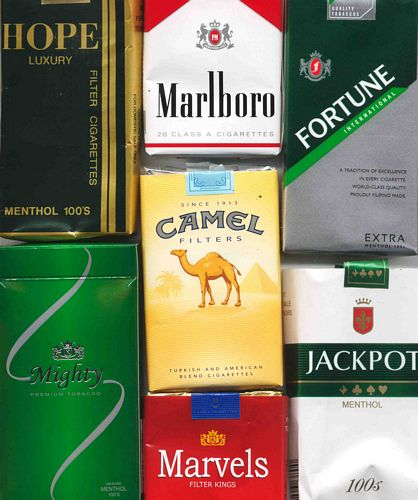
A selection of cigarette brands sold in the Philippines

Tobacco smoking in the Philippines affects a sizable minority of the population. According to the 2015 Global Adult Tobacco Survey (GATS) conducted under the auspices of the Philippines' Department of Health, Philippine Statistics Authority, the World Health Organization, and the United States Centers for Disease Control and Prevention, 23.8 percent of the adult population were "current tobacco smokers". This figures represented 16.6 million of 69 million adult Filipinos.

In 2013, the Philippines had one of the highest smoking rates in Asia and some of the lowest cigarette prices. It is home to several major cigarette and cigar manufacturers, including one owned by Philip Morris International. In 2006, the World Health Organization estimated that 10 Filipinos die every hour due to cancer, stroke, lung and heart diseases brought on by cigarette smoking.

The Philippines is a party to the WHO Framework Convention on Tobacco Control. This caused concern for the World Health Organization when the Philippines hosted one of the world's largest tobacco trade shows, ProTobEx Asia, in 2012 and 2013.

== Health Education ==
=== Community-based ===
Health education in the community is primarily through barangay health centers.

Barangay health workers are effective in addressing health issues in the community as they are trusted as members of the community.

=== School-based ===
Health education is integrated in the school curriculum. For reproductive health education the topics will be on values formation, responsibilities, women and children's rights, gender related laws, teenage pregnancy, and others.

==== Oplan Kalusugan sa DepEd ====
The Oplan Kalusugan sa DepEd (OK sa DepEd) is a school-based health program implemented in public elementary and high school nationwide.

The Program includes:

- National Drug Education Progarm (NDEP)
- Adolescent Reproductive Health Education (ARH)
- Water, Sanitation, and Hygiene (WASH) in Schools Program
- medical, nursing, and dental services
- School-Based Feeding Program (SBFP)

== Barriers to healthcare ==
Poor communities suffer a higher burden of disease due to inequities in access to services and health status. Since financing for local government units often vary and the benefits package for insurance plans may be unfavorable, some communities face difficulties accessing public health services. Shifting the responsibility of healthcare from the federal government to the local governments has increased local authority and has made communities susceptible to lack of access to basic services. In addition, most healthcare payments are made out of pocket, especially when receiving care from privately owned institutions. Barangay health stations serve as primary public health facilities and are staffed by doctors, nurses, midwives, and barangay health volunteers.

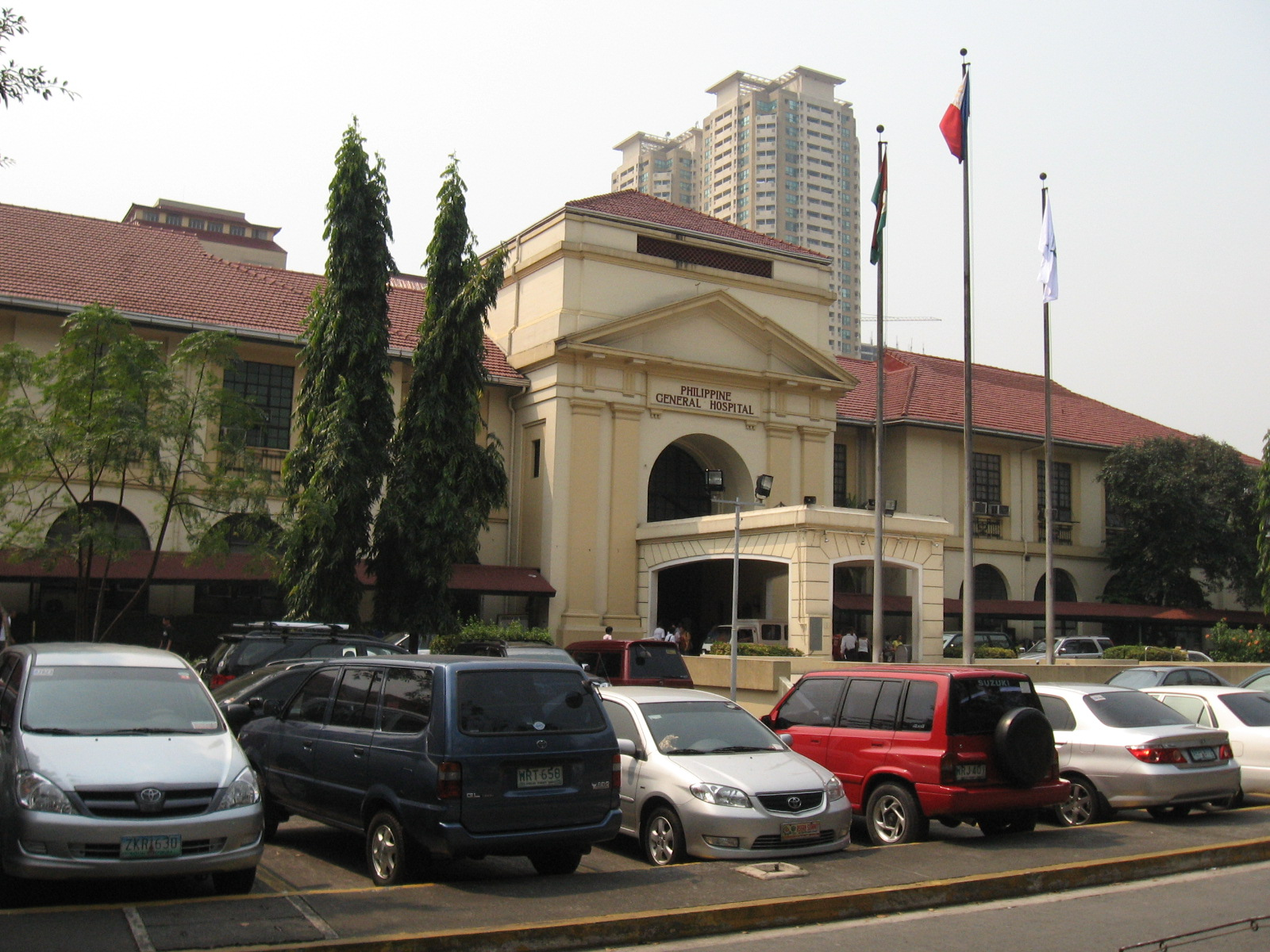
The Philippine General Hospital

There is no requirement in the Philippines for causes of death to be medically determined prior to registration of a death, so national statistics as to causes of death in the Philippines cannot be accurately substantiated. In the provinces, especially in places more remote from registries, births and deaths are often not recorded unless some family need arises, such as entry into college. When there is no legal process needed to pass on inheritance, the recording of deaths is viewed as unnecessary by the family.

== Effects of climate change ==
Climate change, heavy rains, and increased temperatures are linked with the increased transmission of vector and waterborne diseases, such as malaria, dengue, and diarrhea (WHO). The heavy rains and increased temperatures lead to increased humidity which increases the chance of mosquito breeding and survival. Increased natural disasters not only directly contribute to the loss of human life, but also indirectly through food insecurity and the destruction of health services.

Increased disasters not only directly cause more human deaths, but also indirectly cause more deaths by destroying health services and causing food shortages. This disruptions may increase the spread of infectious disease, making recovery and health maintenance much more difficult for impacted communities.

== See also ==
- HIV/AIDS in the Philippines
- Smoking in the Philippines
- Water supply and sanitation in the Philippines
- Nutrition Foundation of the Philippines, Inc.
- Effects of Climate Change on Health in the Philippines
