= Smoking in the Philippines =

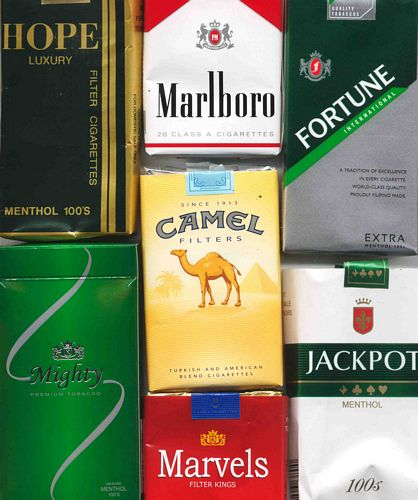
A selection of cigarette brands sold in the Philippines

Tobacco smoking in the Philippines affects a sizable minority of the population. According to the 2015 Global Adult Tobacco Survey (GATS) conducted under the auspices of the Philippines' Department of Health, Philippine Statistics Authority, the World Health Organization, and the United States Centers for Disease Control and Prevention, 23.8 percent of the adult population were "current tobacco smokers". This figures represented 16.6 million of 69 million adult Filipinos.

In 2013, the Philippines had one of the highest smoking rates in Asia and some of the lowest cigarette prices. It is home to several major cigarette and cigar manufacturers, including one owned by Philip Morris International. In 2006, the World Health Organization estimated that 10 Filipinos die every hour due to cancer, stroke, lung and heart diseases brought on by cigarette smoking.

The Philippines is a party to the WHO Framework Convention on Tobacco Control. This caused concern for the World Health Organization when the Philippines hosted one of the world's largest tobacco trade shows, ProTobEx Asia, in 2012 and 2013.

== History ==
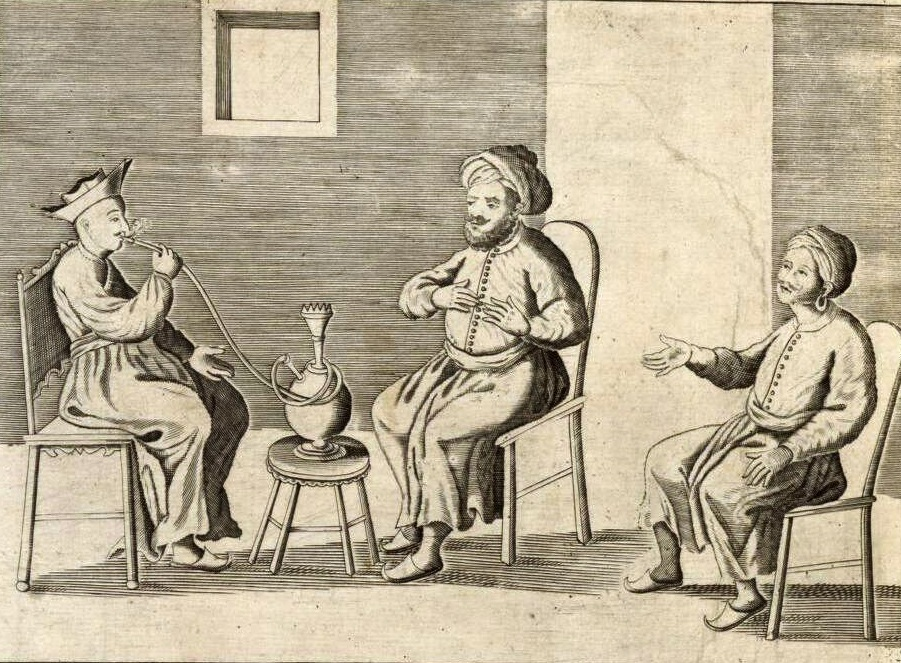
In this illustration from the 1734 Carta Hydrographica y Chorographica de las Yslas Filipinas, an Armenian is seen smoking from a hookah as two Indian men look on

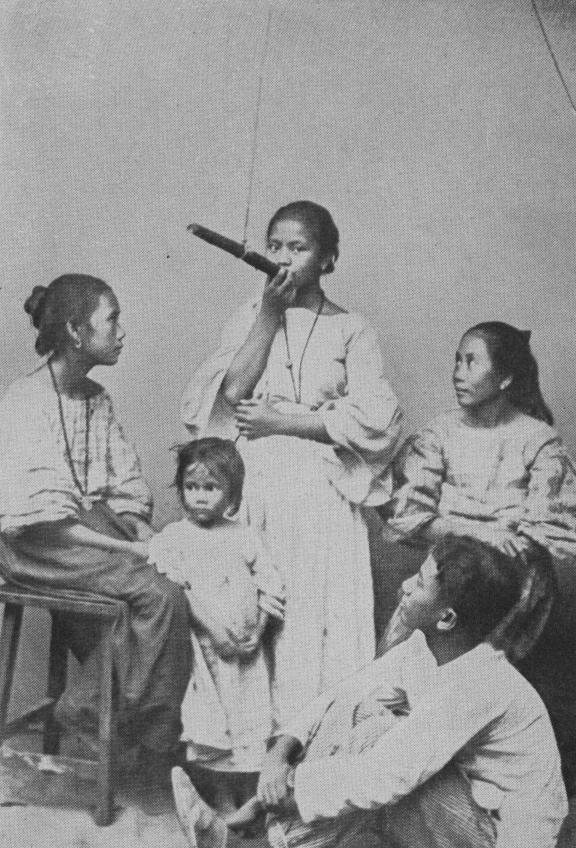
Smoking the family cigar, Northern Luzon, 1912

Tobacco was introduced in the Philippines in the late 16th century during the era of Spanish colonization when the Augustinians brought cigar tobacco seeds to the colony for cultivation. In 1686, William Dampier visited Mindanao and observed that smoking was a widespread custom. It had also become an article of foreign trade with the Dutch from Tidore and Ternate buying rice, beeswax and tobacco from the Spanish colony.

=== Tobacco monopoly ===
The tobacco monopoly in the Philippine islands during the Spanish era was established by Governor-General José Basco y Vargas on March 1, 1782 with the aim of increasing government revenue. Spearheaded by the Sociedad Económica de los Amigos del País (Economic Societies of Friends of the Country), tobacco was cultivated under strict government control confined to the Cagayan Valley, the Ilocos provinces, Nueva Ecija and Marinduque. The tobacco farmers were given quotas each year and the entire crop was then bought by the government. The tobacco leaves were then brought to Manila and made into cigars and cigarettes in government-owned factories, later to be shipped out for export. Tobacco became a major commodity in the galleon trade.

The tobacco monopoly made the colony self-sustaining and profit-earning. In 1808, the government realized a net profit of P500,000.00. These profits increased in subsequent years, reaching $3,000,000 in 1881. As a consequence of the monopoly, the Philippines became the biggest tobacco-producing country in Asia. The farmers abhorred the crop as they were at the mercy of government agents who cheated on its price, and they did not have the liberty to raise other crops for themselves and their families. The monopoly also encouraged bribery and smuggling due to the desire to evade strict government regulations. The tobacco monopoly was abolished in 1882.

== Legislation ==
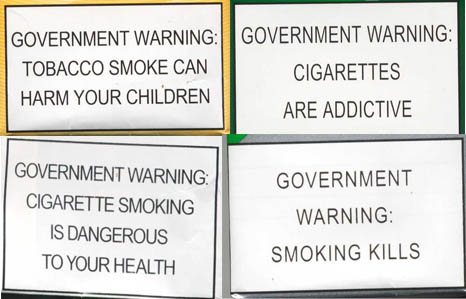
Tobacco packaging warning messages on cigarette packs sold in the Philippines prior to March 2016

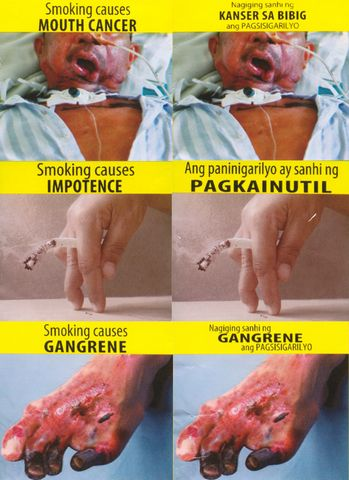
Graphic tobacco packaging warning messages prior to 2018 revision

Republic Act No. 9211, otherwise known as the "Tobacco Regulation Act of 2003", makes it unlawful for any person under the age of 18 years to purchase, sell or smoke tobacco products. Yet a survey conducted by the Department of Health revealed that children as young as five years old are already starting to smoke. The Tobacco Regulation Act also implements certain restrictions and bans on tobacco-related advertisements, endorsements, sponsorships and packaging.

The Tobacco Regulation Act only requires text health warnings, despite the WHO Framework Convention on Tobacco Control treaty which was adopted in May 2003 and of which the Philippines is a signatory. In 2010, the Department of Health issued an administrative order requiring the inclusion of graphic warning labels on packs and prohibiting the use of misleading descriptors such as "mild" and "light" on tobacco product packaging and labels pursuant to Article 11 of the WHO FCTC. In response, the tobacco companies filed five cases against the Department of Health questioning its authority. In June 2014, a legislative committee composed of senators and congressmen passed a bill, called "The Graphic Health Warnings Law", compelling cigarette manufacturers to print pictures and illustrations that warn about the dangers of smoking on cigarette packs. The images would occupy the lower half of the front and rear panels of a cigarette pack and could include pictures of cancerous lungs and throats.

Due to persistent instances of tobacco industry interference, it took more than a year before the law's implementing rules and regulations were finalized by the Inter-Agency Committee on Tobacco (IAC-T), of which the Philippine Tobacco Institute was a member. In March 2016, implementation of the Graphic Health Warning Law came into effect requiring tobacco companies to print twelve graphic health warning templates on cigarette packages being sold in the country. The law's implementing rules and regulations call for all cigarette packages being sold in the market to have graphic warnings that cover the lower half of the pack by November 2016.

=== Smoking ban ===
The Tobacco Regulation Act bans smoking in public places such as schools and recreational facilities, elevators and stairwells, hospitals, nursing homes, laboratories, public conveyances and public facilities such as airports and ship terminals, train and bus stations, restaurants and conference halls, with the exception of separate smoking rooms. On May 16, 2017, President Rodrigo Duterte issued Executive Order 26 reinforcing the tobacco regulation law.

=== Vape Regulation Act ===
On July 25, 2022, the Vaporized Nicotine and Non-Nicotine Products Regulation Act became law. It aims to promote a healthy environment, to protect citizens from potential hazards of these novel consumer products, to reduce the harm caused by smoking, and to restrict access of said products to individuals who are 18 years old and above.

== Statistics ==
The Filipinos' preferred tobacco product is the cigarette, the most popular brand being Marlboro. It is estimated that each adult smoker consumes 838 cigarettes, equating to about 42 cigarette packs, per year.

There are 17.3 million Filipino adult smokers (15 years or older), 84 percent (14.6 million) of which are males and 16 percent (2.8 million) are females. In addition, 23 percent of Filipino adults are daily tobacco smokers; 38.2 percent for males, who on the average smoked 11 cigarettes a day, and 6.9 percent for females, who on average smoked 7 cigarettes per day. Nearly half (48 percent) of the adult smokers had made an attempt to quit, however, only 5 percent were successful.

Second-hand tobacco smoke is also a concern. More than half (55 percent) of adults who use public transportation are exposed to it; in workplaces with no anti-smoking policy, more than 75 percent of workers are exposed.

A survey conducted by the Department of Health in 2007 determined that 1 in 5 Filipino students is a cigarette smoker. Exposure to second-hand tobacco smoke was also high, with 7 in 10 exposed to second-hand smoke around other people outside the home. In addition, more than half of the students had a parent who was a smoker.

According to a 2016 report, 200 Filipinos die every day due to smoking-related diseases.

== See also ==
- Health in the Philippines
- Plain tobacco packaging
