= Philippine Tobacco Institute =

- Company type: Private
- Industry: Tobacco
- Headquarters: Metro Manila, Philippines
- Key people: Rodolfo F. Salanga (President)

The Philippine Tobacco Institute, Inc. is private organization incorporated under Philippine law. It represents, expresses and effects the opinions of the tobacco industry in the Philippines.

== History ==
The Philippine Tobacco Institute has been curbing the Philippine government's efforts to implement tobacco regulation. Since 2007, eleven legal cases have been filed by the tobacco industry against proposed government oversight; the courts have ruled in the industry's favor in all of these cases.

In 2009, the Philippine Tobacco Institute blocked the FDA's intent to gain control over the quality control of tobacco products in the country.

The Philippine Tobacco Institute has expressed its opinion on tobacco control when it submitted a position paper to the World Health Organization during the proposal for the WHO Framework Convention on Tobacco Control in 2000.

The PTI has also lobbied for the Bureau of Internal Revenue to reject a tax stamp system for cigarette packs and successfully reduced the size of graphic warning labels on cigarette packages.

In August 2015, the Southeast Asia Tobacco Control Alliance (SEATCA) to call for its removal from the regulating body.

In May 2017, the Philippine Tobacco Institute approved the president's move to ban smoking in public places, all the while reminding the press about designated smoking areas.

== Members ==
The Philippine Tobacco Institute is a trade association composed of leading tobacco companies in the Philippines. Collectively, its members form "the strongest tobacco lobby in Asia". Some of its members over the years have included:

- Fortune Tobacco Corporation
- La Suerte Cigar and Cigarette Factory
- Sterling Tobacco Company
- Philip Morris Philippines Manufacturing, Inc.
- JT International (Philippines), Inc.
- Mighty Corporation
- British American Tobacco
- Anglo-American Tobacco Corporation
- Altasia

A few of its member companies have since merged, such as Philip Morris Philippines Manufacturing and Fortune Tobacco Corporation, which formed PMFTC in February 2010.

The PTI also sits as a member of the Inter-Agency Committee-Tobacco (IAC-T), an agency with exclusive authority to regulate the packaging, use, sale, distribution, and advertisement of tobacco products.

== See also ==
- Lucio Tan
- Smoking in the Philippines
- Tobacco packaging warning messages#Philippines
