= Nutrition Foundation of the Philippines =

Filipino foundation

Nutrition Foundation of the Philippines, Inc.
- Founded: December 28, 1959
- Founder: Dr. Juan Salcedo Jr.
- Purpose: Nutrition education
- Location: 107 E. Rodriguez Sr. Avenue, Quezon City
- Coordinates: 14.617596°N 121.004148°E
- Website: www.nfp.org.ph

The Nutrition Foundation of the Philippines, Inc. (NFP) is a Philippine private, non-stock, non-profit organization dedicated to promoting good nutrition in Filipino communities. The NFP was founded by National Scientist, Dr. Juan Salcedo Jr.

The NFP was founded on December 28, 1959, registered at the Securities and Exchange Commission on January 18, 1960, and officially began operations on July 15, 1960.

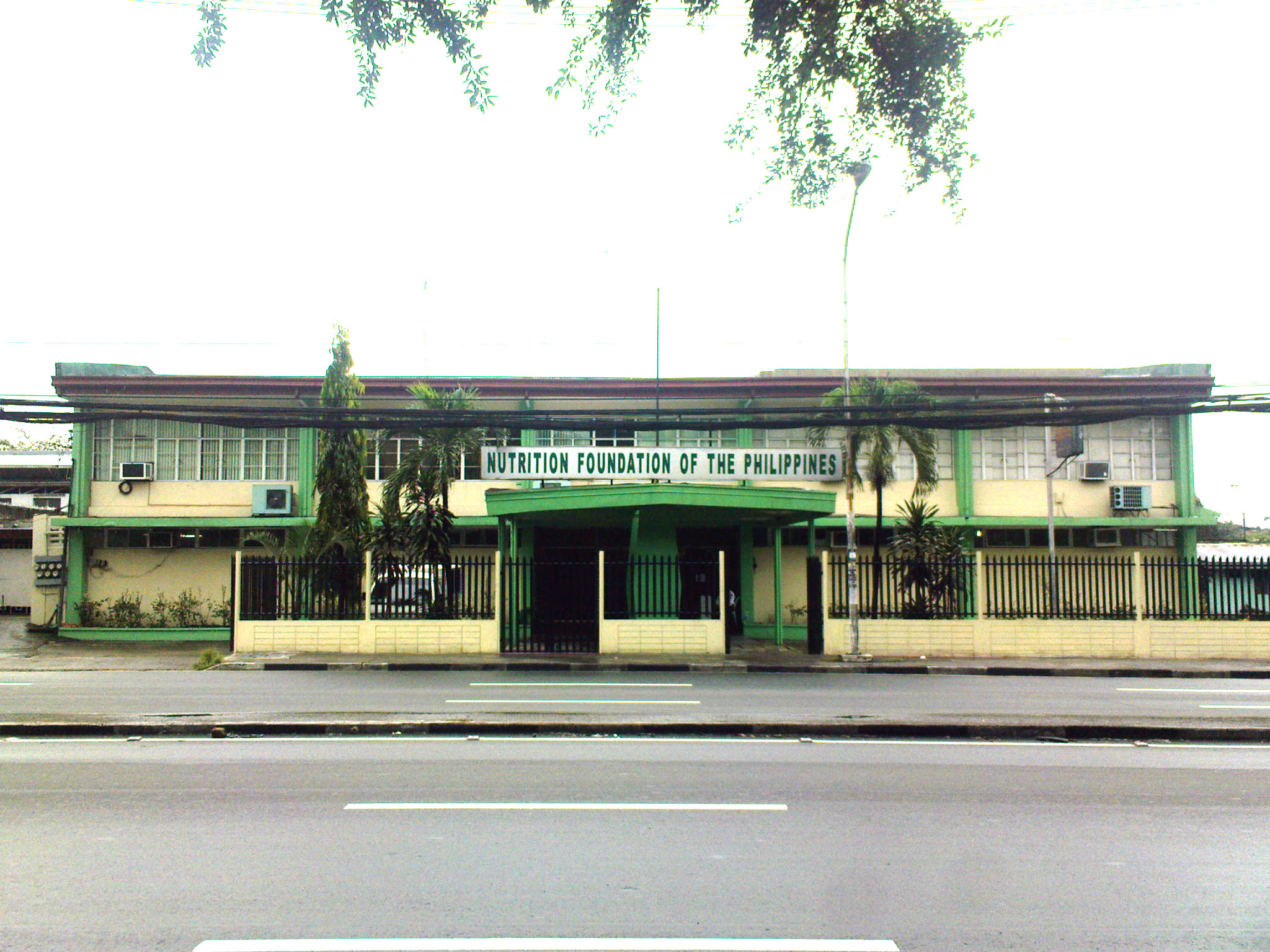
Dr. Juan Salcedo Jr. Building, located along E. Rodriguez Sr. Avenue, Quezon City

== Objectives ==
1. To promote awareness and practice of nutrition principles through a campaign directed at the public in general and the vulnerable groups in particular
2. To increase manpower resources for community nutrition work through depth training programs
3. To develop a pool of resource persons through staff development programs
4. To develop/improve techniques and approaches to nutrition education through applied research
5. To assist/cooperate with government and private agencies involved in nutrition work.

The NFP is known for various nutritional education programs.

- Their Nutrition and Health Kiddie Class (NHKC) program which aims to educate children, aged four to six, about the importance of food and nutrition.

They have also implemented the Urban Family Development Program in 1991 to improve the nutritional status of depressed urban families through livelihood assistance and health and nutrition classes and services.

=== Nutrition and Health Kiddie Class (NHKC) ===
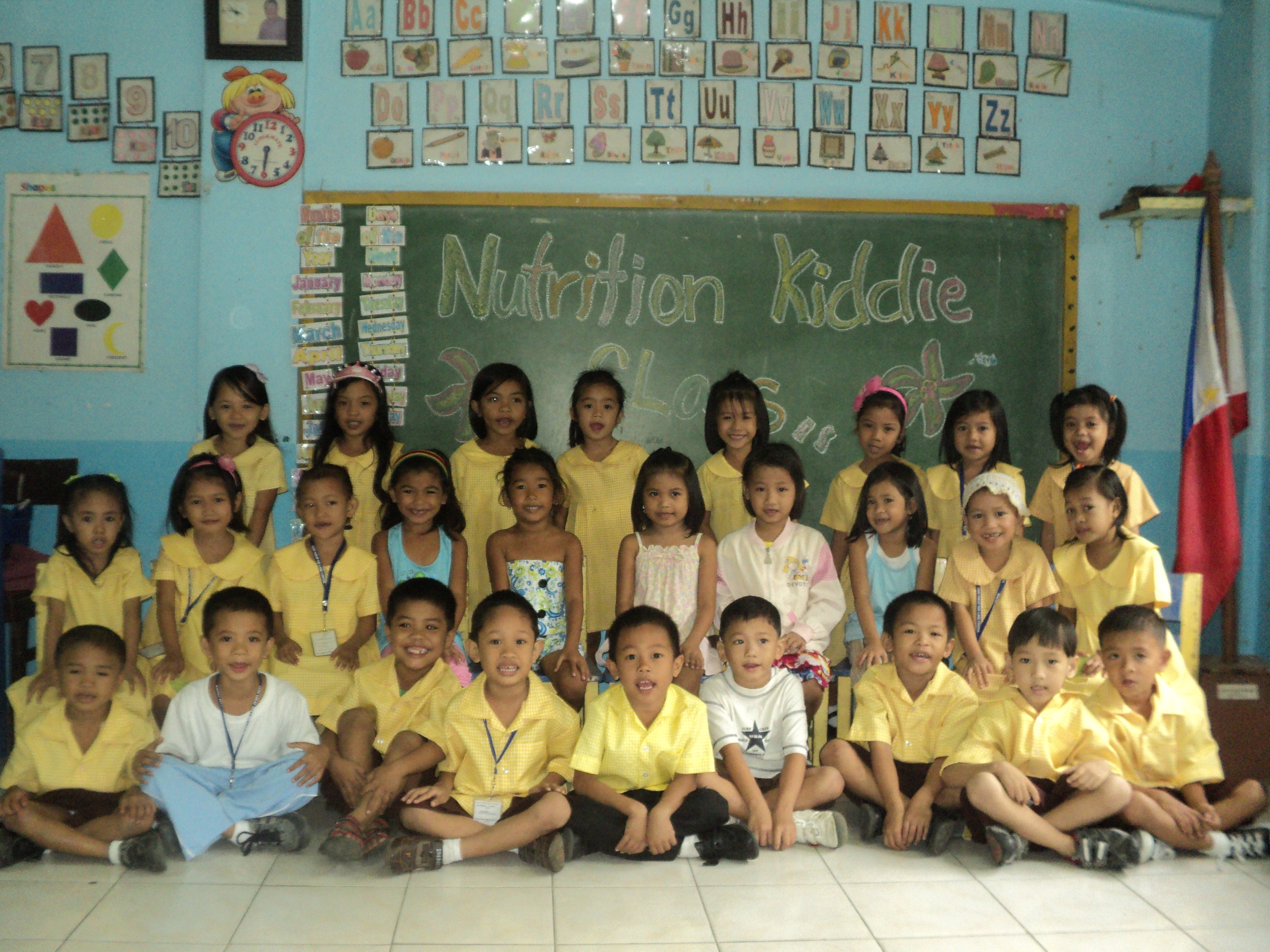
NHKC at Daan Tubo, Loyola Heights, Quezon City

A unique feature of the NHKC is the participation of the volunteer teachers who handle all the classes without any compensation. Usually, they are mothers or youth from the community/ barangay who are trained to teach the preschool aged 4–6 years. They are called “MOTHER COORDINATORS (MCs) or NUTRITION YOUTH COORDINATORS (NYCs)”, respectively. The NHKC follows the school calendar, from June of the current year till March of succeeding year. Classes are held daily or 2-3 times a week, depending on the community. A session lasts for 2 hours.

The NHKC has a supplementary feeding component. Primarily, the feeding aims to show the child and their mothers on how to feed them properly and to internalize the topics/subjects taught in the NHKC. Foods served are nutritious, easy -to -prepare and economical, which can also be prepared and served at home for the rest of the family members. The marketing, preparation, and cooking are done by the mothers of the children for the supplementary feeding sessions.

=== Family Development Program (FDP) ===
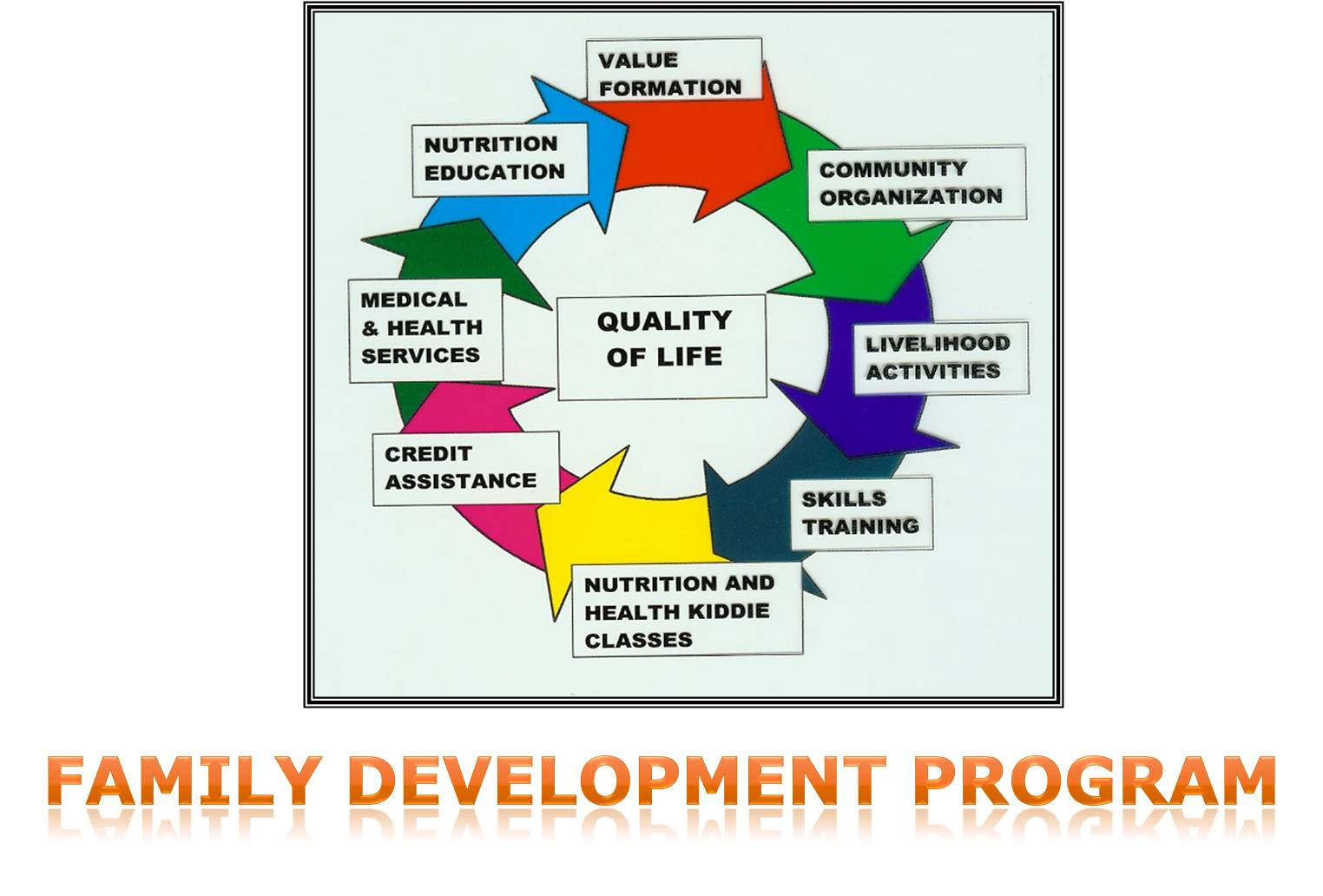
Family Development Program

This is one of the major activities of the Foundation that focus on the development of the family members to be responsible for the betterment of their health and ultimately improving the quality of their lives through: conscious recognition of each and everyone's responsibility to themselves, family and community; providing opportunities and support to augment regular income through learning of some income generating activities, improved health and nutrition condition of their families through the implementation of some direct nutrition intervention activities; and developing skills in the implementation and management of community nutrition project and related activities. Some of its components include the following:

==== Values Formation ====
NFP promotes activities that help individuals realize his value and potentials towards the development of the communities where he lived. It is the main goal of this program to make people realize a very important role he is to play for the success of their plans for the benefit of the community.

==== Community Organization ====
NFP helps organize the communities and facilitates group dynamics, teambuilding activities and programs designed to promote camaraderie, teamwork, and cooperation among the people. Yearly program planning and evaluation focusing on problems encountered in the program implementation is also regularly conducted.

==== Medical, Dental, and Nutrition Services ====
In cooperation with the local health centers or district health units- medical, dental, and nutrition services are conducted. A team of doctors, dentists, nutritionists, and barangay health worker goes around the puroks of the barangay, on a regular schedule, to render services such as deworming, regular weighing, and dietary counseling.

Currently, the FDP is being undertaken in communities of Quezon City namely – Brgy. Santol, Brgy. Doña Imelda, Sitios Kaingin I, Kaingin II, and Proper of Brgy. Pansol and Sitios Chamberette, Mary Town, Park 7, and Daan-Tubo of Brgy. Loyola Heights; Tondo, Manila, and in the whole Municipality of Alaminos, Laguna.

=== Dr. Juan Salcedo Jr. Memorial Lecture ===
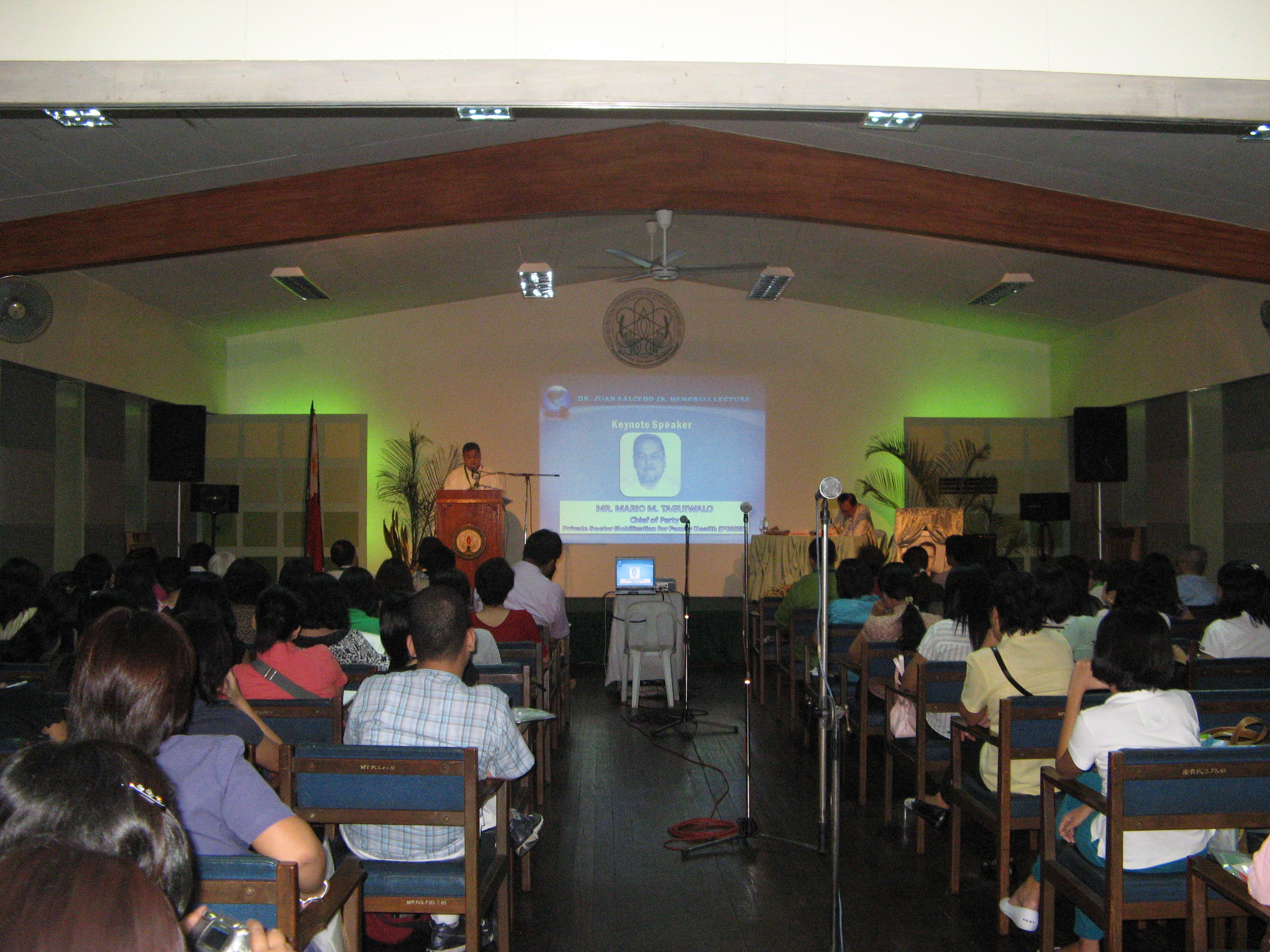
2008 Dr. Juan Salcedo Jr. Memorial Lecture with Mr. Mario Taguiwalo as the resoure speaker

In the past years, the Foundation invited speakers who discussed topics on: “Collaboration and Institutional Development, The Politics of International Nutrition; Nutritional Repercussions of Developmental Transition; Perspectives and Challenges in Nutrition in the Philippines; Cancer and You; Management of Nutrition Programs by Local Executives; Infant and Young Child Nutrition; Coconut Oil and Cardio-Vascular Diseases, and Strategies in the Prevention and Management of Hidden Hungers”.

=== Nutrition Networking ===
Another way of ensuring effectiveness in the use of scarce resources is by networking and coordinating with the different agencies that aim and work with a common objective. This program is done mainly through cooperative services with GOs and NGOs in the country as well as international agencies/organizations; membership in working committees/advocacy groups; provision of resource persons/speakers; and consultation services.

For a number of years, NFP has been the Philippines Adhering Body of the International Union of Nutritional Sciences (IUNS). It is also a Founding Member of the Southeast Asia Public Health Nutrition Network (SEA-PHN). Likewise, it has maintained linkages with other international agencies such as the Federation of Asian Nutrition Societies (FANS), UNICEF, International Food Policy Research Institute, Helen Keller International, and the World Health Organization.

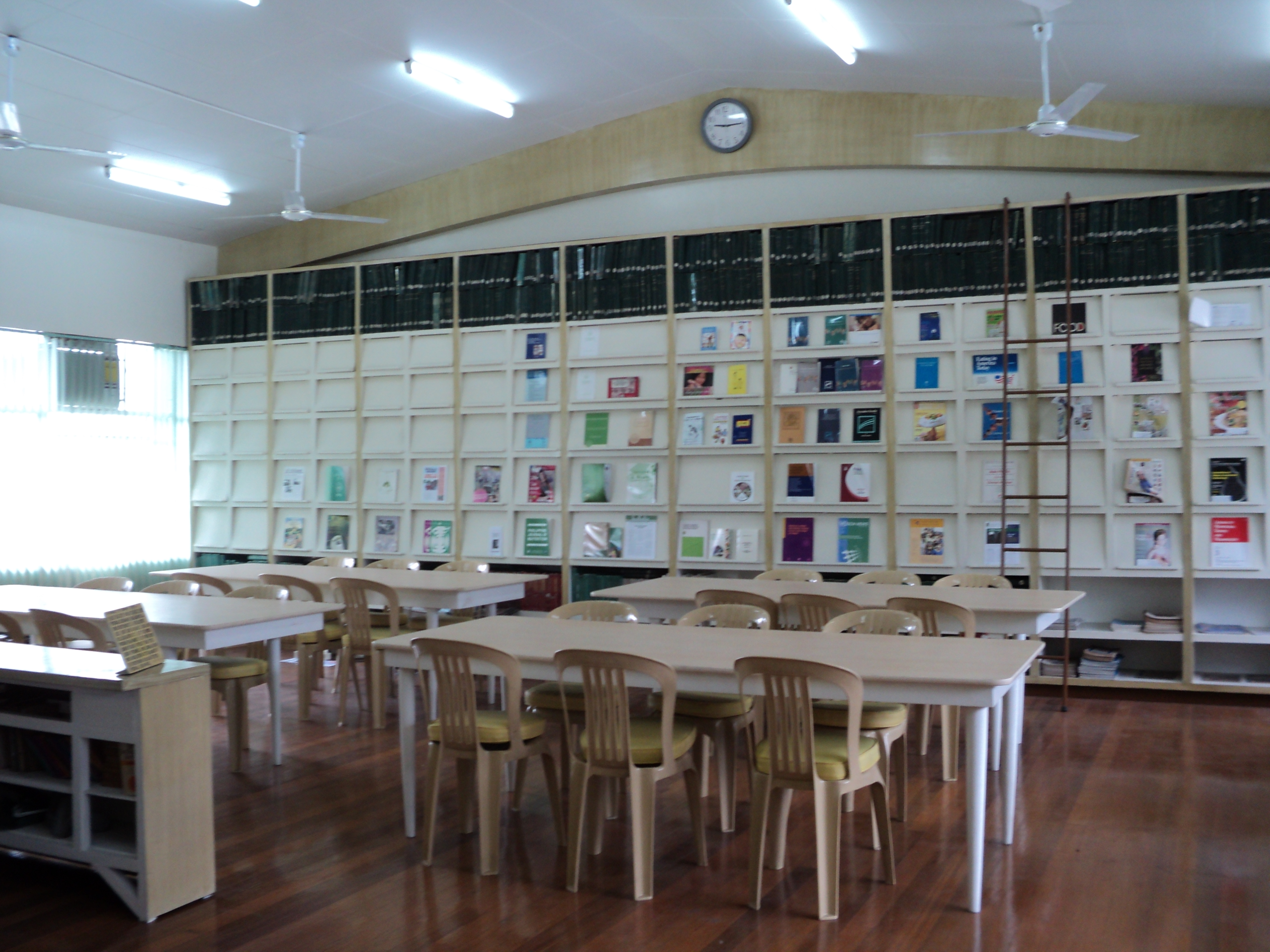
E.O. Carrasco Memorial Library

=== Publications ===
The Foundation publishes various books of nutritious recipes.
