= Climate change adaptation in the Philippines =

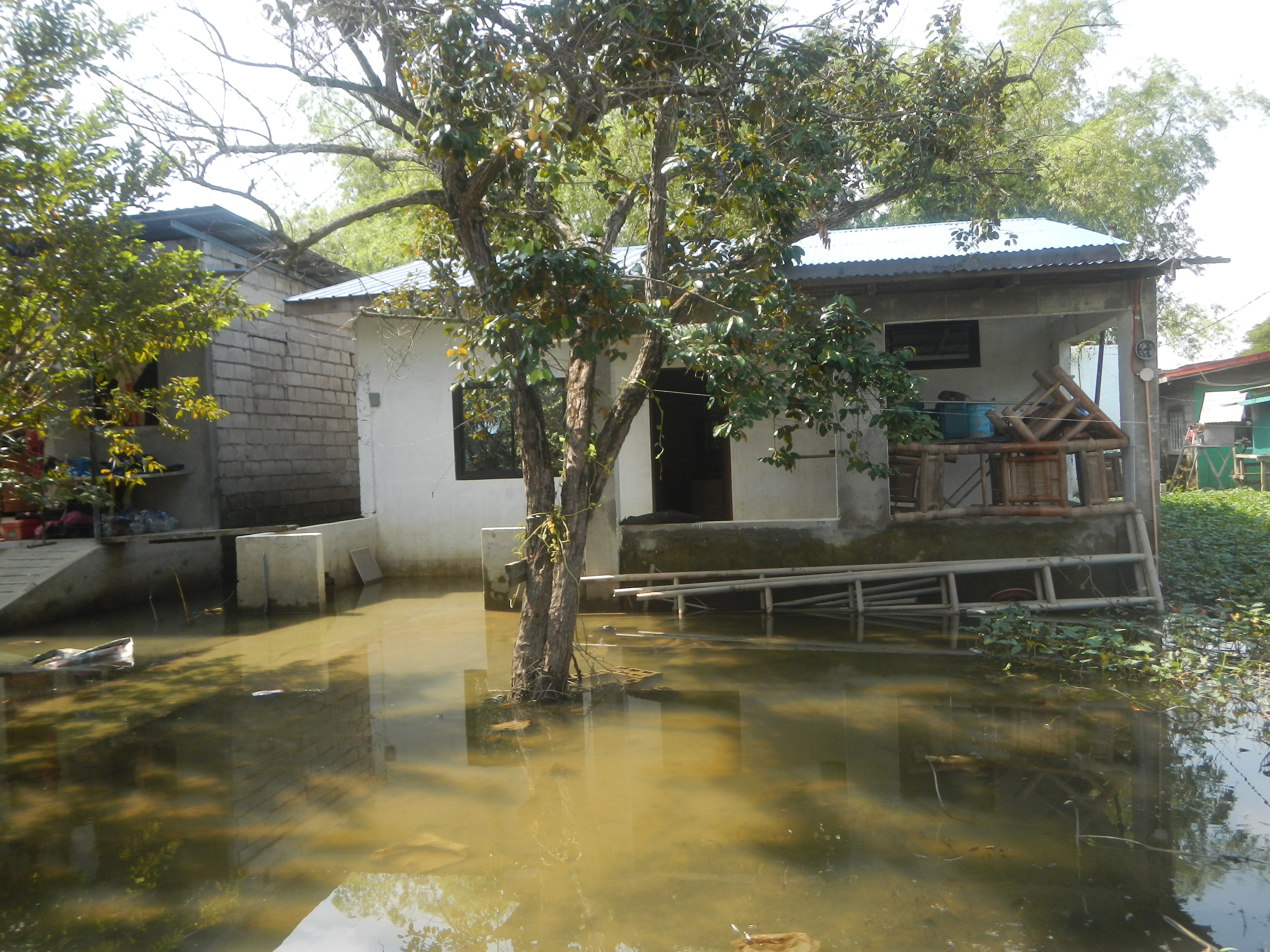
Tidal Flooding in Meysulao, Calumpit

Climate change adaptation in the Philippines is being incorporated into development plans and policies that specifically target national and local climate vulnerabilities. As a developing country and an archipelago, the Philippines is particularly vulnerable to a variety of climatic threats like intensifying tropical cyclones, drastic changes in rainfall patterns, rising sea levels, and rising temperatures. According to the UN Office for the Coordination of Humanitarian Affairs (OCHA), the Philippines is one of the most disaster-prone countries in the world. In 2021, the Global Climate Risk Index ranked the Philippines fourth of the ten countries most affected between the years 2000 and 2019. The need for managing climate risks through climate change adaptation has become increasingly evident. Adaptation can reduce, moderate or avoid current and expected climate effects or take advantage of beneficial climatic events. Developing greater resilience to various threats can be a major goal of comprehensive disaster risk reduction strategy. The Philippines is therefore working on a number of national and local adaptation and disaster risk reduction strategies to build the country's climate resilience. However, emerging scholarship has highlighted that adaptation strategies can also be shaped by political ideologies, such as populism and authoritarian governance, which may reframe or even weaponize adaptation to serve political ends rather than purely environmental or humanitarian goals.

== National-level adaptation strategies ==
Logo of the CCC

=== Climate Change Commission ===
The Climate Change Commission (CCC) is the primary government policy-making body in the Philippines tasked with coordinating, monitoring and evaluating government initiatives to ensure that climate change is taken into account in all national, local, and sectoral development plans in order to create a climate-smart and resilient nation. CCC programs include the Communities for Resilience (CORE), the People's Survival Fund (PSF), and the Comprehensive Integrated Climate Change Adaptation and Resilience Program for the Indigenous Peoples, among others.

=== Climate Change Act ===
The Climate Change Act (CCA) was amended in 2012 and presented the People's Survival Fund, which allocates a budget of 1 billion Philippine pesos annually for financing adaptation programs and projects based on the National Framework Strategy on Climate Change (NFSCC). The CCA establishes a framework for policy, creates an administrative structure for the organization and allocates budgetary resources for its crucial functions. These functions include developing a framework strategy and programmes, integrating climate risk, recommending policies and significant development investments in sectors with a high vulnerability to climate change. Depending on the situation, the fund may be expanded. Donations, endowments, grants, and contributions may also be added to it. The CCA initiatives in the nation, particularly at the municipal level, are further strengthened by these revisions.

=== National Climate Change Action Plan ===
The Conference of Parties to the United Nations Framework Convention on Climate Change (UNFCCC) recognized that national climate planning can help nations identify their vulnerabilities, mainstream climate change concerns, and address adaptation. The Philippines thus developed the National Climate Change Action Plan (NCCAP) to achieve country-driven programs on adaptation and mitigation. Based on technical evaluations and discussions with government organisations and stakeholders, the NCCAP sets the nation's plan for adaptation and mitigation from 2011 to 2028. The cross-cutting topics are capacity building, technology transfer, research and development, and gender and development.

Food security, water sufficiency, environmental and ecological stability, human security, climate-friendly industries and services, sustainable energy, and knowledge and capacity development were the seven strategic priorities defined by the NCCAP. Achieving these seven objectives would increase communities' ability to adapt to change, increase the resilience of natural ecosystems, and increase the sustainability of the built environment. The ultimate goal is to achieve a successful transition to climate-smart development with contributions from climate-smart industries and services, sustainable energy, and knowledge and capacity development. The phases of implementation under NCCAP are aligned with the National Disaster Risk Reduction and Management Plan and the Philippine Development Plan (PDP), the country's development framework that seeks to address poverty, create employment opportunities and achieve inclusive growth.

== Local-level adaptation strategies ==
=== Ecotown Demonstration Framework ===
The implementation of the National Climate Change Action Plan at the local level is illustrated based on the notion of an ecologically sound and economically resilient town or ecotown. An ecotown is a planning entity made up of municipalities situated near or inside the borders of important biodiversity hotspots that are highly vulnerable to climate change. By utilising an ecosystem-based approach that will scale up best practises, ecotowns will be constructed around important biodiversity hotspots and protected areas. This will increase the adaptive capacity of communities through economic means (income, employment) and the resilience of ecosystems through protection, conservation, and sustainable management.

According to the CCC, the objective of implementing the Ecotown Demonstration Framework is to contribute to goals 1, 5 and 7 of the Millennium Development Goals (MDG); eradicate extreme poverty and hunger, improve maternal health, and ensure environmental sustainability. The concept of ecotowns is not unique to the Philippines, however, the country's application of this framework prioritizes the idea of climate adaptation. The approach of the CCC's Ecotown Demonstration Framework is therefore to mainstream climate change adaptation and disaster risk reduction in local development activities, plans and programs. This highlights the pivotal role of local government units as first responders to the risks of climate change.

Local government units are directed to update their respective action plans to reflect changes in local social, economic, and environmental issues. The national government provides technical and financial assistance to local government units so they may accomplish their Local Climate Change Action Plan (LCCAP). LCCAPs outline how local governments intend to address the impacts of climate change and incorporate climate adaptation and mitigation measures into local development plans. The suggested LCCAP process is: 1) preparing and organizing an LCCAP Core Team; 2) data gathering, vulnerability assessment, risk analysis, and validation; 3) planning, prioritization, and budgeting; and 4) monitoring and evaluation.

=== Ecotown in San Vicente, Palawan ===
The Municipality of San Vicente, Palawan has completed a successful ecotown project in line with the LCCAP adaptation process. The CCC partnered with the Global Green Growth Institute (GGGI) to implement the Ecotown project between 2012 and 2015 in the Municipality of San Vicente to achieve ecological stability and economic resilience. GGGI had funded all components of the ecotown project. In the project's report, it is outlined that San Vicente, as an island province, is vulnerable to sea-level rise and inundation. For example, seawalls were constructed in the area to mitigate coastal flooding but extreme weather conditions may render these ineffective. A range of adaptation measures was developed based on San Vicente's development priorities and consultations with local stakeholders and experts. Such measures include, but are not limited to, bottom-up approaches like the use of drought and flood-resistant crop varieties, organic farming practices, government training for alternative livelihood, coral rehabilitation, promoting the sustainable use of marine resources; and community-based forest management programs.

=== Local Climate Change Action Plan in the City of Iloilo ===
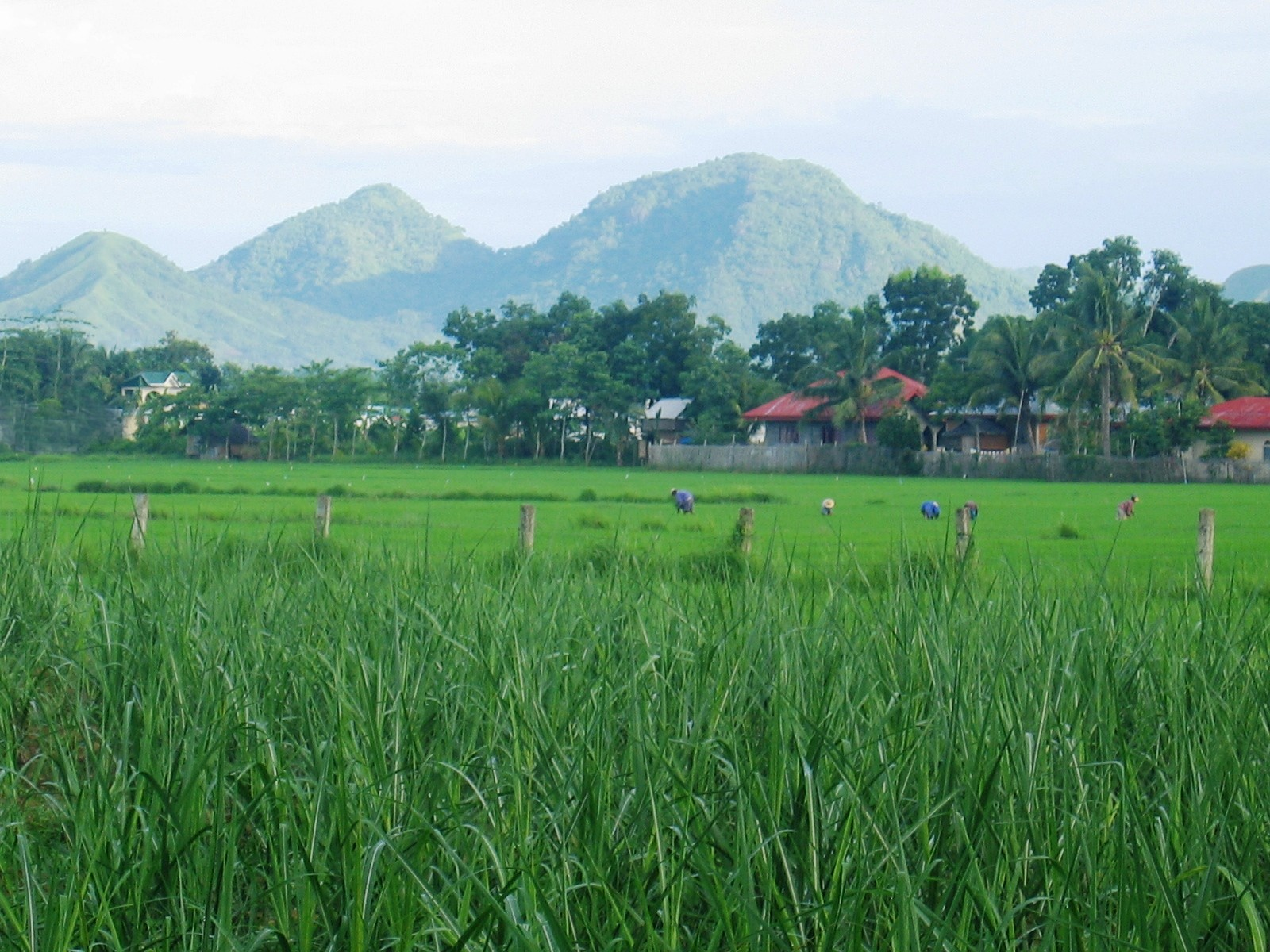
Banate Countryside in Iloilo

In April 2014, the City of Iloilo completed an LCCAP that accounts for the next 14 years (2014–2028). The plan identifies adaptation and mitigation strategies for climate change based on a hazards-based approach (temperature increase, flooding, sea-level rise, typhoons, drought, and storm surge). The goals of the LCCAP are to build the adaptive capacities of men and women in their communities; increase the resilience of vulnerable sectors and natural ecosystems to climate change; and optimize mitigation opportunities toward gender-response and rights-based sustainable development. Iloilo City developed a Vulnerability and Adaptation Assessment report of the city's susceptibility to climate change based on consultations with stakeholders. The report identified gaps in the city's adaptive capacity, as well as the degree of sensitivity of sectors, and the magnitude of impacts. A Hot Spot assessment conducted by Professor Jorge Ebay also found that Iloilo City is prone to storm surges, tsunamis, earthquakes, drought, and flash rainwater floods. Among the adaptation measures developed were improving city flood management; mangrove reforestation; developing green urban infrastructure; and adjusting the cropping calendar.

== Nature-based solutions ==
=== Mangroves conservation ===
Mangroves can significantly reduce risks from flooding in the Philippines by protecting people and property from storms, floods, and erosion. A study examining the protection services of mangroves in the Philippines found that mangroves and other coastal habitats act as natural defences to reduce the impacts of natural disasters. The aerial roots, trunks and canopy of mangroves reduce the force of oncoming wind and waves and retain sediments. Mangrove loss has been caused by the conversion of land to other uses and because the Philippines has not quite valued the natural protection they provide. The Philippines WAVES program is tackling this loss in mangroves by developing mangrove accounts and valuing the coastal protection services provided by mangroves. The WAVES study can inform policy and practice of the social and economic valuation of mangroves to mainstream risk reduction and prioritize sites for mangrove conservation and restoration for coastal communities.

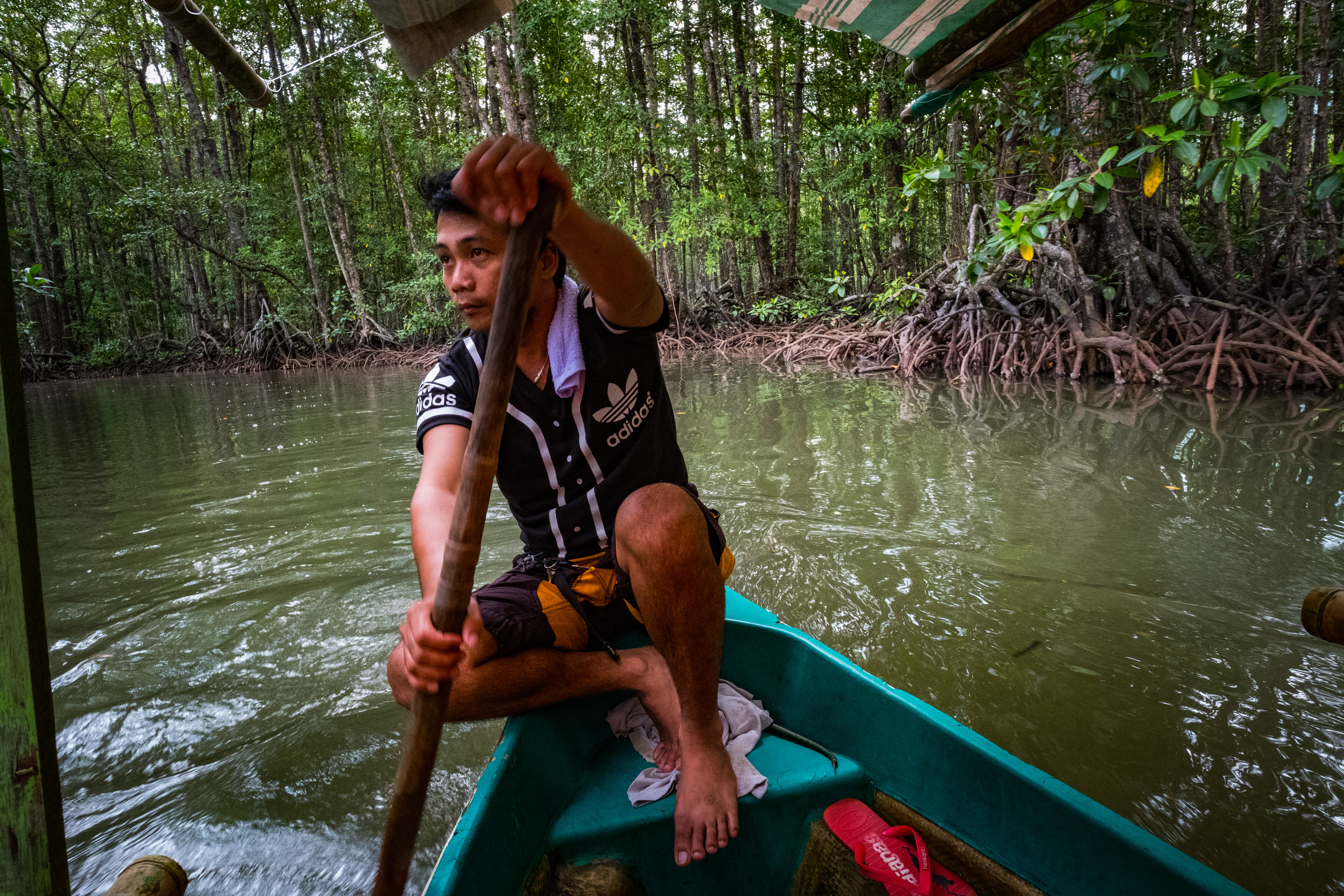
Mangroves Ecotourism in Sabong Beach, Puerto Princesa, Palawan, Philippines

=== Marine protected areas ===
The general framework of marine-protected areas (MPAs) integrates adaptation and variation. The majority of the MPAs in the Philippines are community-based marine sanctuaries that aim to prevent the destruction of coastal resources and ecosystems, increase the yield of fishers, and prevent further biodiversity loss. The case of Balicasag Island's sanctuary is one where local residents and officials responded to declining coral reef conditions by establishing marine sanctuaries. The loss of marine resources on Balicasag Island have been caused by destructive fishing practices like blast fishing. As a result, 8 ha of the island reef was turned into a marine sanctuary through community organizing. Unfortunately, due to the forces of weak institutions, lack of resources, and poverty, the efforts of MPAs have been undermined and relatively unsuccessful in the Philippines.

=== Forest management ===
Agroforestry has been identified in some provinces of the Philippines as a "climate-smart" approach to agricultural systems that have been threatened by the biophysical and socioeconomic shocks of climate change. The Wahig-Inabanga watershed on the island province of Bohol is a case whereby farmers, household members and community leaders identified trees as a means of adapting to the heavy rainfall and increasing temperatures experienced in the region. The case study found that farms that had deliberately planted trees were more likely to recognize the contribution of trees toward coping with the impacts of climate change. Specifically, the majority of timber tree species were appreciated for their regulating functions, whilst non-timber trees were regarded as sources of food and money.

== Infrastructural and technological measures ==
=== Renewable energy ===
Renewable energy sources can emit little to no greenhouse gases or pollutants into the air, which reinforces the adaptation efforts of climate-vulnerable countries. The Philippines ranks second in the world for geothermal electricity generation and total biomass power generation. The Philippines has a 53% renewable, 66.8% green, and self-sufficient electricity generation mix. Environmental organisations like Greenpeace are dissatisfied with these numbers, however, because coal still accounts for 37% of power generation. The economic gains of renewable energy usage in the Philippines have not benefited the rural poor either, who are paying much more for electricity than urban users. In response, the national government enacted the Renewable Energy Act in 2008 to prioritize the use of renewable energy and to provide investment incentives for the private sector.

=== Desalination ===
Desalination can contribute to climate change adaptation in areas where water scarcity is a significant issue. Since desalination is an energy-intensive process, it must be done using renewable energy. The amount of available potential water resources in the Philippines is relatively high, however, only 9 in every 10 Filipinos can access general households' basic water supply. The Philippine government plans to invest about 1.07 trillion Philippine pesos from 2020 to 2030 to ensure that everybody can access clean water. Since the country is surrounded by water, seawater desalination can be a promising solution for addressing the country's water shortage. The largest power plant in the Philippines is the Ilijan Plant in Batangas City, which has desalination capability. However, this sort of technology is only slowly emerging in the country and because of high energy cost, desalination may only be considered an option.

== Media and movements ==
=== 2019 ===
On September 20, 2019, the Philippine government encouraged public school students to skip classes and join the worldwide movement of climate protests. Over 500 students and youth advocates across the country joined the global youth climate strike that day. Later that year, 600 people gathered in Manila on November 29 for the Global Day of Action. According to Lidy Nacpil of the Asian People's Movement on Debt and Development, the turnout was much lower than expected which was probably because social issues like poverty and unfair labour practices are a higher priority than climate for many Filipinos.

=== 2020 ===
For the 2020 Fridays for Future movement, members of the Youth Advocates for Climate Action Philippines (YACAP) held an "aerial art attack" at the University of the Philippines. Members laid down on a cloth world map while holding up placards calling for climate action. According to Mitzi Jonelle Tan of YACAP, they were protesting President Duterte's coal power expansion, land reclamation and mining projects.

=== 2021 ===
On September 24, 2021, climate protesters paraded through Manila with an effigy of President Duterte resembling a giant plant monster in support of the Fridays for Future movement. The effigy was used to raise awareness of the government's environmentally destructive policies.

=== 2022 ===
On March 25, 2022, Filipino youth climate strikers from the Greenpeace-led Love, 52 Youth and Elections Movement called on presidential candidates to consider the future impacts of climate change on the country's next generation. Members of the movement even wrote "love letters" to local and national political candidates advocating for climate action.

=== 2024 ===
On March 11, 2024, the Department of Environment and Natural Resources' Toni Yulo-Loyzaga and the European Union launched the €60 million (P3.67 billion) "Green Economy Programme for the Philippines" in the form of a grant from 2023 to 2028 to mitigate environmental degradation and combat climate change to foster economic growth and social inclusivity. "The successful launch of the Green Economy Programme for the Philippines is part of the EU's new Global Gateway Strategy and shows our commitment worldwide to combating climate change while promoting inclusive economic development," EU Ambassador Luc Véron said.

== See also ==
- Climate change
- Climate change mitigation
- Climate justice
- Climate vulnerability monitor
- Anthropocene
- Environmental issues in the Philippines
- Ecoregions in the Philippines
- List of protected areas of the Philippines
