= Robert R. Williams =

American chemist

Robert Runnels Williams
- Born: February 16, 1886; Nellore, Madras Presidency, British India (now Nellore, Andhra Pradesh)
- Died: October 2, 1965 (aged 79); Summit, New Jersey
- Citizenship: American
- Education: University of Chicago
- Known for: Synthesis of thiamine
- Awards: Willard Gibbs Award (1938); Elliott Cresson Medal (1940); Perkin Medal (1947); William Procter Prize (1955)
- Scientific career
- Fields: Chemistry
- Workplaces: Bell Telephone Laboratories

Robert Runnels Williams (February 16, 1886 – October 2, 1965) was an American chemist, known for being the first to chemically fully characterize and then synthesize thiamine (vitamin B_{1}). He first isolated thiamine in 1933, and synthesized it in 1935, reporting this in 1936. Williams also provided the modern name "thiamine" from the molecule's sulfur atom, and it being a vitamin (a class ultimately named for the earlier-known amine of thiamine itself).

Among his awards were the Elliott Cresson Medal in 1940 and the Perkin Medal in 1947. He was elected to both the American Philosophical Society and the United States National Academy of Sciences. His brother was Roger J. Williams, another important chemist at the time and discoverer of Vitamin B_{5}.

== Life ==
He was born in Nellore, India to Baptist missionaries. He moved to the United States when he was ten. In the early 1900s, Williams studied at Ottawa University and eventually procured a master's degree at the University of Chicago in 1908. He then spent some time teaching in the Philippines. After returning to the United States, he worked for Bell Telephone Laboratories from 1915, until he retired in 1945.

A resident of Summit, New Jersey, Williams died there at the age of 79 on October 2, 1965.

== Work ==
- 1933-4 - developed a way of isolating 1/3 an ounce of thiamine from a ton of rice polishings.
- 1935 - Worked out its molecular structure and named it "thiamine" from its sulfur atom and amino group
- 1935 - Synthesized thiamine (vitamin B_{1}), reporting the work in 1936.
