= Effects of climate change on human health =

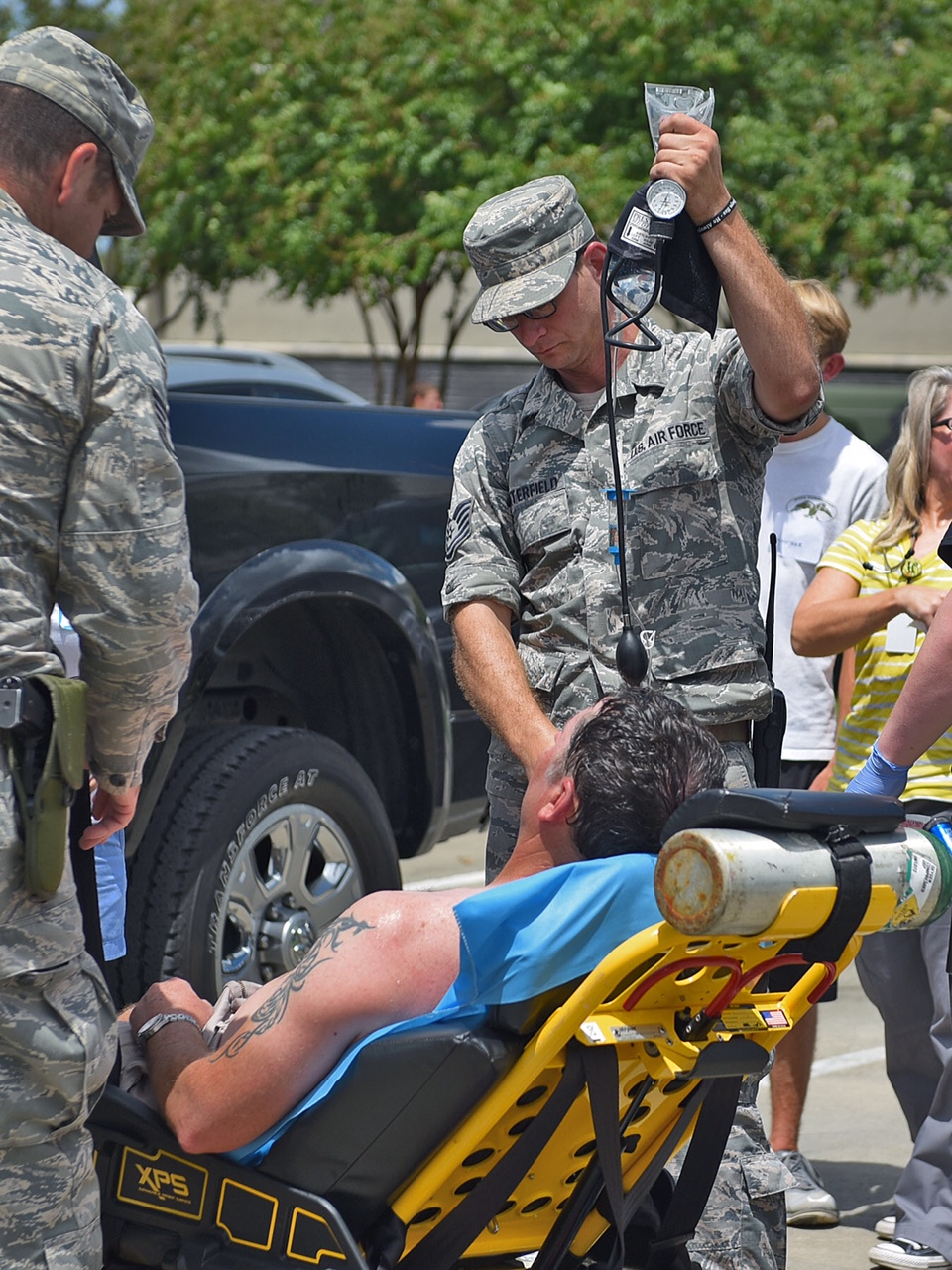
Heat stroke treatment at Baton Rouge during the 2016 Louisiana floods. Climate change is making heat waves more intense, leading to a higher risk of heat stroke.

Climate change affects human health in many ways, including an increase in heat-related illnesses and deaths, worsened air quality, the spread of infectious diseases, and health risks associated with extreme weather such as floods and storms. Rising global temperatures and changes in weather patterns are increasing the severity of heat waves and extreme weather events. These events in turn have direct and indirect impacts on human health. For example, when people are exposed to higher temperatures for longer time periods they might experience heat illness and heat-related death.

In addition to direct impacts, climate change and extreme weather events cause changes in biomes. Certain diseases that are carried and spread by living hosts such as mosquitoes and ticks (known as vectors) may become more common in some regions. Affected diseases include dengue fever and malaria. Contracting waterborne diseases such as diarrhoeal disease will also be more likely.

Changes in climate can cause decreasing yields for some crops and regions, resulting in higher food prices, less available food, and under nutrition. Climate change can also reduce access to clean and safe water supply. Extreme weather and its health impact can also threaten the livelihoods and economic stability of people. These factors together can lead to increasing poverty, human migration, violent conflict, and mental health issues.

Climate change affects human health at all ages, from infancy through adolescence, adulthood and old age. Factors such as age, gender and socioeconomic status influence to what extent these effects become wide-spread risks to human health. Some groups are more vulnerable than others to the health effects of climate change. These include children, the elderly, outdoor workers and disadvantaged people.

== Overview of health effects and pathways ==
The effects of climate change on human health can be grouped into direct and indirect effects. Extreme weather, including increased storms, floods, droughts, heat waves and wildfires can directly cause injury, illness, or death. Numerous studies also emphasize that these effects are unequally distributed, with vulnerable populations and regions bearing a disproportionate burden. The indirect impact of climate change happens through changes in the environment that change the Earth's natural systems on a large-scale. These include worsening water quality, air pollution, reduced food availability, and faster spread of disease-carrying insects.

Recent research highlights that these direct and indirect health impacts are increasingly interlinked, as climate change contributes simultaneously to worsening food and water insecurity, undernutrition, and infectious disease burdens across diverse populations. The World Health Organization likewise reports that climate change is already contributing to increases in undernutrition, vector-borne diseases, and heat-related mortality, with disproportionate impacts on vulnerable populations.

Both direct and indirect health effects vary across the world and between different groups of people according to age, gender, mobility and other factors. For example, differences in health service provision or economic development will result in different health risks and outcomes, with less developed countries facing greater health risks. In many places, the combination of lower socioeconomic status and gender roles result in increased health risks to women and girls as a result of climate change, compared to those faced by men and boys (although the converse may apply in other instances).

The various health effects that are related to climate change include cardiovascular diseases, respiratory diseases, infectious diseases, undernutrition, mental illness, allergies, injuries and poisoning.

The provision of health care can also be impacted by the collapse of health systems and damage to infrastructure due to climate-induced events such as flooding. Therefore, building health systems that are climate resilient is a priority. The World Health Organisation has called climate change the biggest global health threat of the 21st century.

== Health risks from extreme weather and climate events ==
Climate change is increasing the frequency and intensity of some extreme weather events. Extreme heat and cold events are the most likely to increase and worsen followed by more frequent heavy rain or snow and increases in the intensity of droughts.

Extreme weather events, such as floods, hurricanes, heatwaves, droughts and wildfires can result in injuries, death and the spread of infectious diseases. For example, local epidemics can occur due to loss of infrastructure, such as hospitals and sanitation services, but also because of climate changes creating a more suitable weather for disease-carrying organisms.

=== Heat ===
Since the 1970s, temperature on the surface of Earth has become warmer each decade. This increase happened faster than in any other 50-year period over at least the last 2000 years. Compared to the second half of the 19th century, temperature in the 21st century show a warming of 1.09 °C.

Extreme heat is a direct threat to health, especially for people over 65 years, children, people living in cities and those who have already existing health conditions. Rising global temperatures impact the health and well being of people in multiple ways. In the last few decades, people all over the world have become more vulnerable to heat and experienced an increasing number of life-threatening heatwave events. Extreme heat has negative effects on mental health as well, raising the risk of mental health-related hospitalizations and suicidal.

Although heat itself is not a direct threat to health on its own, a combination of factors of rising temperatures can detriment one's health. The effects of heat on an individual's health is influenced by temperatures, humidity, exercise, hydration, age, pre-existing health status and also by occupation, clothing, behavior, autonomy, vulnerability, and sense of obligation.

Physical exercise is beneficial for reducing the risk the many illnesses and for mental health. At the same time the number of hours per day when the temperature is dangerously high for outdoor exercise has been increasing. The rising heat also impacts people's ability to work and the number of hours when it is not safe to work outdoors (construction, agriculture, etc.) has also increased.

It is estimated that between 1960 and 1990, climate change has put over 600 million people (9% of the global population) outside the human climate niche which is the average temperature range in which people have been able to thrive in the past 6,000 years. Unless greenhouse gas emissions are reduced, regions inhabited by a third of the human population could become as hot as the hottest parts of the Sahara within 50 years. The projected annual average temperature of above 29 °C for these regions would be outside the biologically suitable temperature range for humans.

==== Heat-related health effects for vulnerable people ====
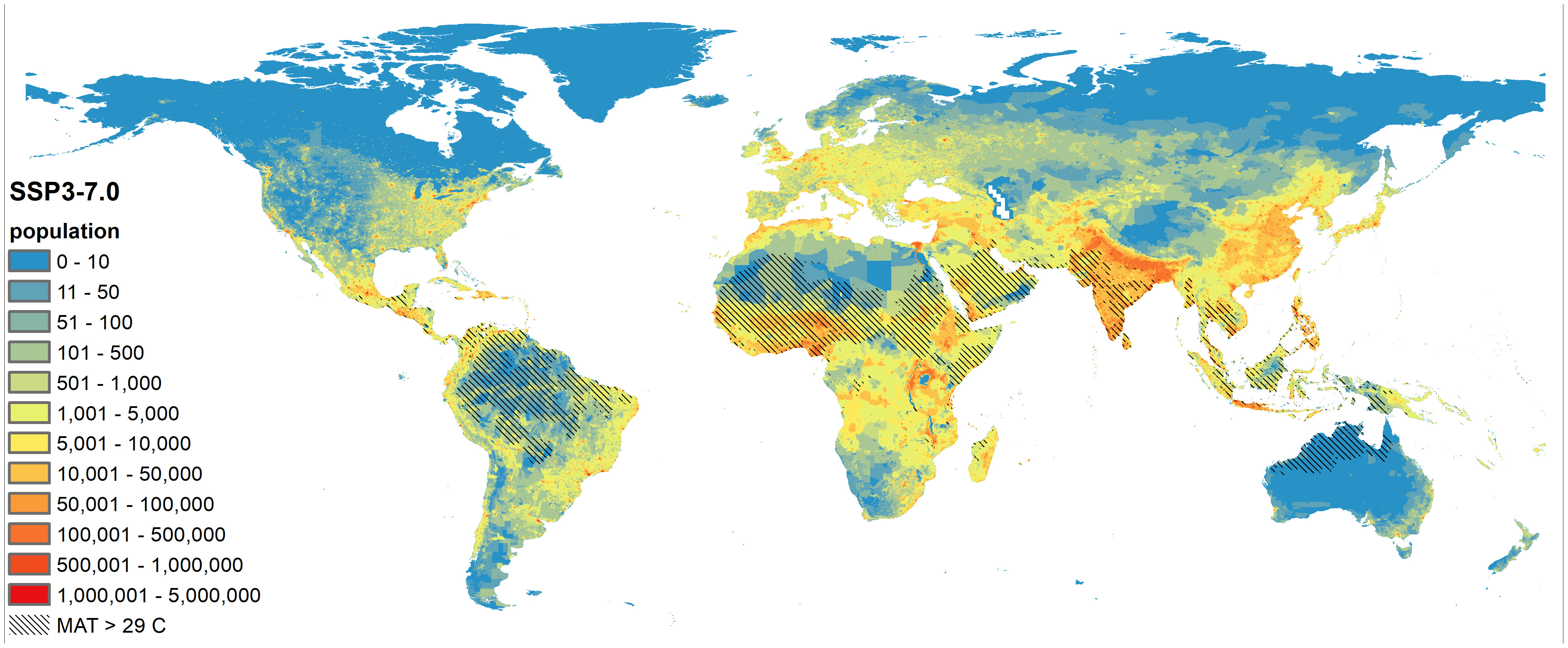
Overlap between future population distribution and extreme heat

Exposure to extreme heat poses an acute health hazard, especially for people deemed as vulnerable. Vulnerable people with regard to heat illnesses include people with low incomes, minority groups, women (in particular pregnant women), children, older adults (over 65 years old), people with chronic diseases, disabilities and multiple long-term health conditions. Other people at risk include those living in urban environments (due to the urban heat island effect), outdoor workers and people who take certain prescription drugs.

Climate change increases the frequency and severity of heatwaves and thus heat stress for people. A 2022 global study found that heat-related deaths increased significantly between 2000 and 2019, particularly in tropical and low-income countries, underscoring the growing health burden from rising temperatures. Human responses to heat stress can include heat stroke and overheating (hyperthermia). Extreme heat is also linked to acute kidney injury, low quality sleep, and complications with pregnancy.Furthermore, it may cause the deterioration of pre-existing cardiovascular and respiratory disease. Adverse pregnancy outcomes due to high ambient temperatures include for example low birth weight and pre-term birth.Heat waves have also resulted in epidemics of chronic kidney disease (CKD). Prolonged heat exposure, physical exertion, and dehydration are sufficient factors for the development of CKD.

The human body requires evaporation of sweat to cool down and prevent overheating, even with a low activity level. With excessive heat and humidity human bodies would no longer be able to adequately cool the skin. A wet-bulb temperature of 35 °C is regarded as the limit for humans (called the "physiological threshold for human adaptability" to heat and humidity). As of 2020, only two weather stations had recorded 35 °C wet-bulb temperatures, and only very briefly, but the frequency and duration of these events is expected to rise with ongoing climate change. Global warming above 1.5 degrees risks making parts of the tropics uninhabitable because the threshold for the wet bulb temperature may be passed. A wet-bulb temperature of 31 degrees is already considered dangerous, even for young and healthy people. This threshold is not uniform for all and depend on many factors including environmental factors, activity and age. If the global temperature will rise by 3 degrees (the most likely scenario without reducing the use of fossil fuels), temperatures will exceed this limit at large areas in Pakistan, India, China, sub-Saharan Africa, United States, Australia, and South America.

People with cognitive health issues (e.g. depression, dementia, Parkinson's disease) are more at risk when faced with high temperatures and ought to be extra careful as cognitive performance has been shown to be differentially affected by heat. People with diabetes and those who are overweight, have sleep deprivation, or have cardiovascular/cerebrovascular conditions should avoid too much heat exposure.

The risk of dying from chronic lung disease during a heat wave has been estimated at 1.8–8.2% higher compared to average summer temperatures. An 8% increase in hospitalization rate for people with chronic obstructive pulmonary disease (COPD) has been estimated for every 1 °C increase in temperatures above 29 °C.

==== In urban areas ====
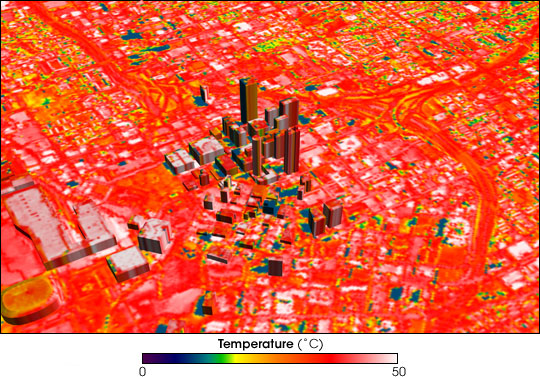
Increasing heat waves are one effect of climate change that affect human health: Illustration of urban heat exposure via a temperature distribution map: red shows warm areas, white shows hot areas.

The effects of heatwaves tend to be more pronounced in urban areas because they are typically warmer than surrounding rural areas due to the urban heat island effect. This results from the way many cities are built. For example, they often have extensive areas of asphalt, reduced greenery along with many large heat-retaining buildings that physically block cooling breezes and ventilation. Lack of water features are another cause.

Extreme heat exposure in cities with a wet bulb globe temperature above 30 °C tripled between 1983 and 2016. It increased by about 50% when the population growth in these cities is not taken into account.

Cities are often on the front-line of climate change due to their densely concentrated populations, the urban heat island effect, their frequent proximity to coasts and waterways, and reliance on ageing physical infrastructure networks.

==== Heat-related mortality ====
Health experts warn that "exposure to extreme heat increases the risk of death from cardiovascular, cerebrovascular, and respiratory conditions and all-cause mortality. Heat-related deaths in people older than 65 years reached a record high of an estimated 345 000 deaths in 2019". In more recent years in 2024, adults aged 80 and older are at even greater risk of heat-related mortality, making elderly individuals particularly vulnerable to the health impacts of extreme heat. More than 70,000 Europeans died as a result of the 2003 European heat wave. Also more than 2,000 people died in Karachi, Pakistan in June 2015 due to a severe heat wave with temperatures as high as 49 °C (120 °F).

A 2025 Countdown report published by The Lancet estimated that heat-related mortality worldwide averaged 546,054 deaths per year between 2012 and 2021, a 63.2% increase from the annual average of 334,672 deaths between 1990 and 1999. Population growth accounted for part of this increase, but the population-adjusted mortality rate also rose from 5.9 to 7.2 deaths per 100,000 people, representing a 23.3% increase.

Due to climate change temperatures rose in Europe and heat mortality increased. From 2003–12 to 2013–22 alone, it increased by 17 deaths per 100,000 people, while women are more vulnerable than men.

A study from 2025 published in Nature Climate Change examined how future global warming could affect deaths during extreme heat waves in Europe. Researchers estimated that if weather conditions similar to the August 2003 European heat wave occurred at a global warming level of 1.5 degrees Celsius, about 17,800 excess deaths would occur across Europe in just one week. At 3 degrees Celsius of warming, that number increases to 32,000 deaths. The study also found that current climate change adaptation measures in Europe may not be enough to substantially reduce deaths during extreme heat events.

Increasing access to indoor cooling (air conditioning) will help prevent heat-related mortality but current air conditioning technology is generally unsustainable as it contributes to greenhouse gas emissions, air pollution, peak electricity demand, and urban heat islands.

Mortality due to heat waves could be reduced if buildings were better designed to modify the internal climate, or if the occupants were better educated about the issues, so they can take action on time. Heatwave early warning and response systems are important elements of heat action plans.

==== Reduced labour capacity ====
Heat exposure can affect people's ability to work. The annual Countdown Report by The Lancet investigated change in labour capacity as an indicator. It found that during 2021, high temperature reduced global potential labour hours by 470 billion – a 37% increase compared to the average annual loss that occurred during the 1990s. Occupational heat exposure especially affects laborers in the agricultural sector of developing countries. In those countries, the vast majority of these labour hour losses (87%) were in the agricultural sector.

Working in extreme heat can lead to labor force productivity decreases as well as participation because employees' health may be weaker due to heat related health problems, such as dehydration, fatigue, dizziness, and confusion.

==== Sports and outdoor exercise ====
With regards to sporting activities, it has been observed that "hot weather reduces the likelihood of engaging in exercise". Furthermore, participating in sports during excessive heat can lead to injury or even death. It is also well established that regular physical activity is beneficial for human health, including mental health. Therefore, an increase in hot days due to climate change could indirectly affect health due to people exercising less.

According to the 2024 Lancet Countdown report, people worldwide experiences an additional 328 hours per year of hot weather conditions, making outdoor exercise potentially unsafe due to heat stress. This is a 27.7% increase compared with the annual average during 1990-1999.

=== Droughts ===
Climate change affects multiple factors associated with droughts, such as how much rain falls and how fast the rain evaporates again. Warming over land increases the severity and frequency of droughts around much of the world. Many of the consequences of droughts have effects on human health.

=== Floods ===
Due to an increase in heavy rainfall events, floods are expected to become more severe in the future when they do occur. However, the interactions between rainfall and flooding are complex. In some regions, flooding is expected to become rarer. This depends on several factors, such as changes in rain and snowmelt, but also soil moisture. Floods have short and long-term negative implications to people's health and well-being. Short term implications include mortalities, injuries and diseases, while long term implications include non-communicable diseases and psychosocial health aspects. From a mid-term perspective, floods can seriously impact infrastructure, thereby disrupting emergency services and access to medical facilities such as hospitals. This disruption can even affect hospitals located far from the epicenter of the extreme event. For example, the 2022 Pakistan floods (which were likely more severe because of climate change) affected people's health directly and indirectly. There were outbreaks of diseases like malaria, dengue, and other skin diseases.

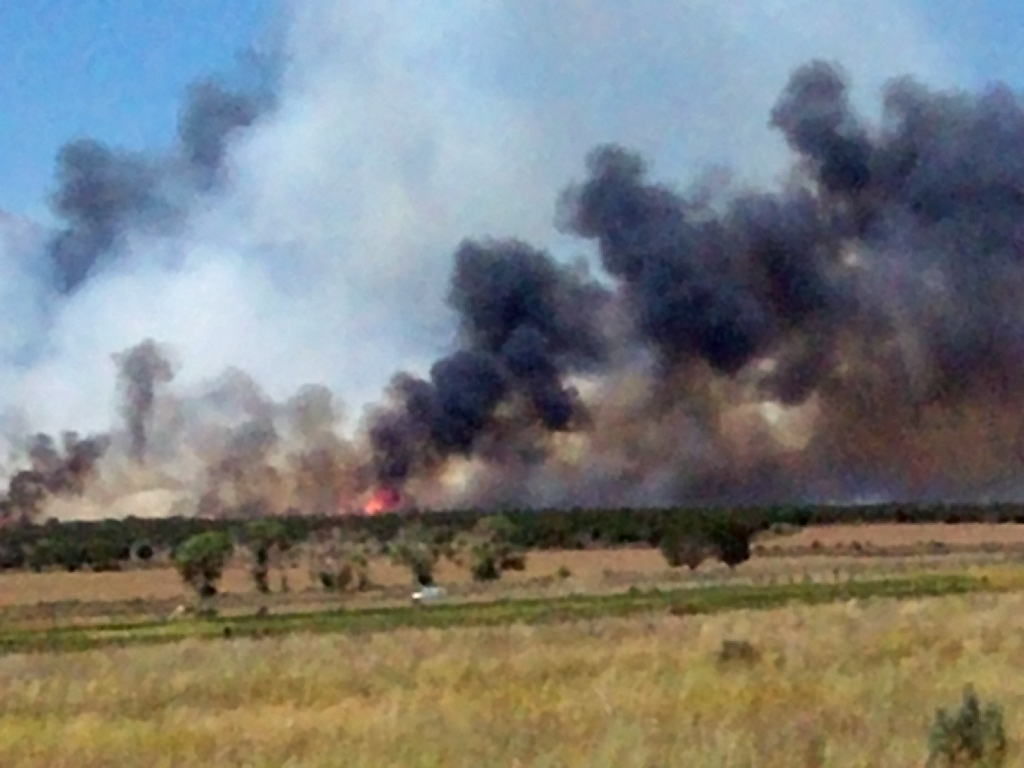
Air pollution from a surface fire in the western desert of Utah. Wildfires become more frequent and intense due to climate change.

=== Wildfires ===
Climate change increases wildfire potential and activity. Climate change leads to a warmer ground temperature and its effects include earlier snowmelt dates, drier than expected vegetation, increased number of potential fire days, increased occurrence of summer droughts, and a prolonged dry season. Wood smoke from wildfires produces particulate matter that has damaging effects to human health. The health effects of wildfire smoke exposure include exacerbation and development of respiratory illness such as asthma and chronic obstructive pulmonary disorder; increased risk of lung cancer, mesothelioma and tuberculosis; increased airway hyper-responsiveness; changes in levels of inflammatory mediators and coagulation factors; and respiratory tract infection.

=== Storms ===
Storms become wetter under climate change. These include tropical cyclones and extratropical cyclones. Both the maximum and mean rainfall rates increase. This more extreme rainfall is also true for thunderstorms in some regions. Furthermore, tropical cyclones and storm tracks are moving towards the poles. This means some regions will see large changes in maximum wind speeds. Scientists expect there will be fewer tropical cyclones. But they expect their strength to increase.

== Health risks from climate-sensitive infectious diseases ==
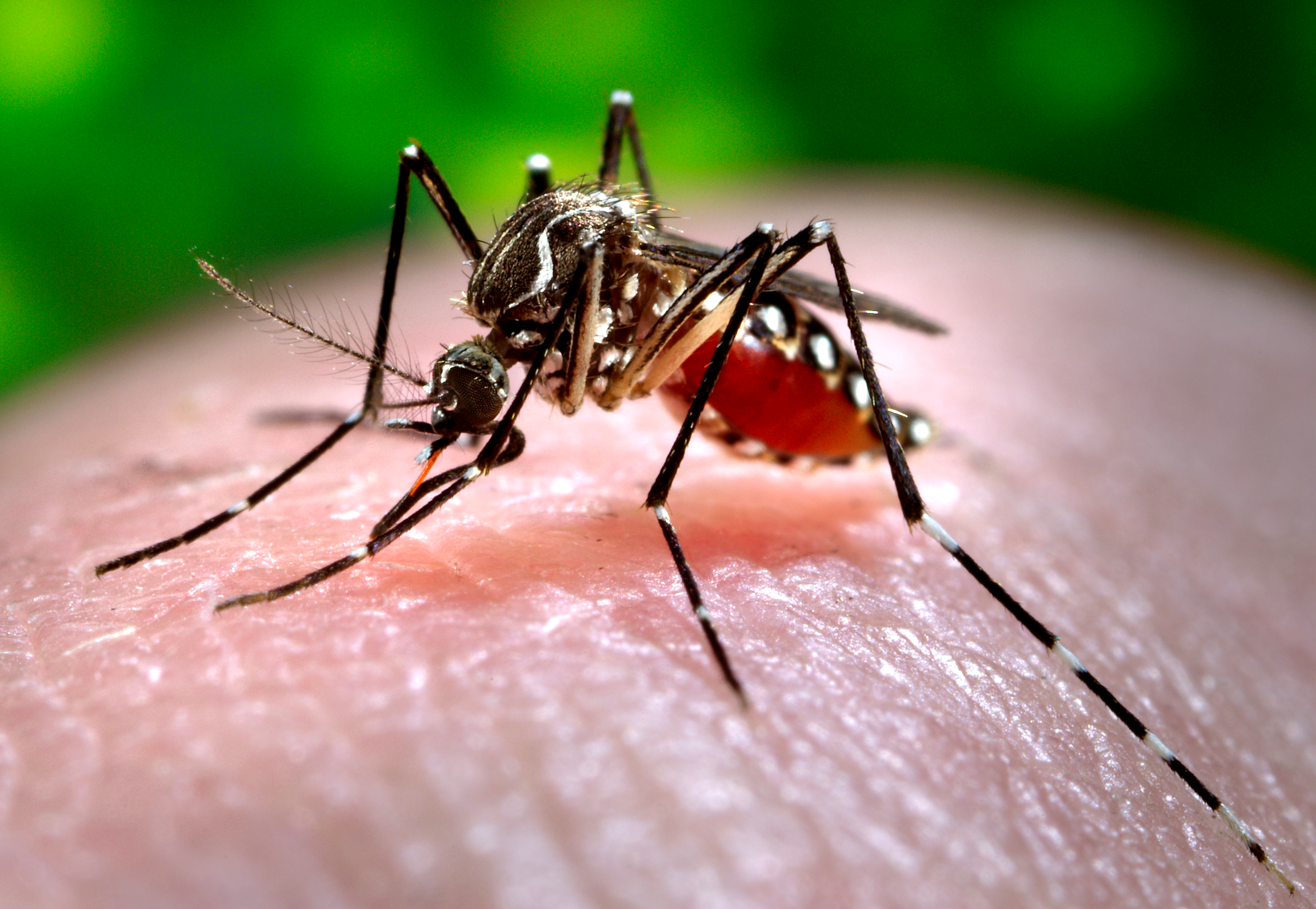
Climate change is altering the geographic range and seasonality of some insects that can carry diseases, for example Aedes aegypti, the mosquito that is the vector for dengue transmission.

Climate change is influencing the transmission and burden of many infectious diseases worldwide. Rising temperatures, shifting rainfall patterns, and more frequent extreme weather events affect how pathogens, vectors and disease hosts interact. These changes are altering the geographic ranges and seasonal activity of disease-carrying organisms such as mosquitoes and ticks, and influence the growth and survival of bacteria and other pathogens in food and water systems.

Infectious diseases that are sensitive to climate can be grouped into: vector-borne diseases (transmitted via mosquitos, ticks etc.), waterborne diseases (transmitted through viruses or bacteria in water), and food-borne diseases (spread through pathogens in food). In 2022 scientists stated a clear observation that "the occurrence of climate-related food-borne and waterborne diseases has increased."

== Health risks from changes in air quality ==
=== Indoor air quality ===
Indoor air pollution is known to affect the health, comfort, and well-being of building occupants. It has also been linked to sick building syndrome, respiratory issues, reduced productivity, and impaired learning in schools. Indoor air quality is linked inextricably to outdoor air quality. Climate change can affect indoor air quality by increasing the level of outdoor air pollutants such as ozone and particulate matter, for example through emissions from wildfires caused by extreme heat and drought. There are numerous predictions for how indoor air pollutants will change in future. Models have attempted to predict how the forecasted scenarios will affect indoor air quality and indoor comfort parameters such as humidity and temperature.

The net-zero challenge requires significant changes in the performance of both new and retrofitted buildings. Increased energy efficient housing (without good ventilation systems) can trap pollutants inside them, whether produced indoors or outdoors, and lead to an increase in human exposure.

=== Ozone-related health burden ===
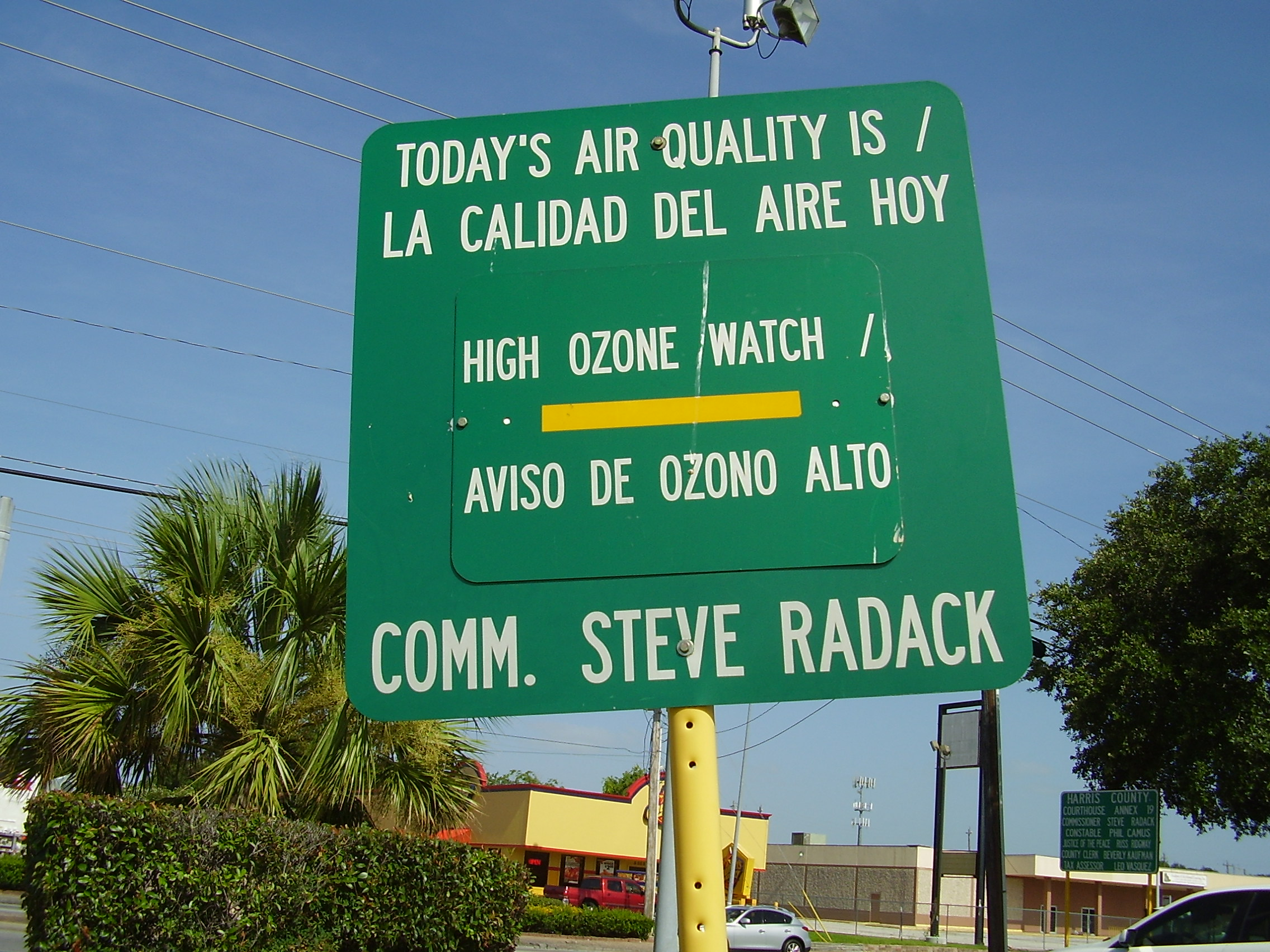
Signboard in Gulfton, Houston indicating an ozone watch.

The relationship between surface ozone (also called ground-level ozone) and ambient temperature is complex. Changes in air temperature and water content affect the air's chemistry and the rates of chemical reactions that create and remove ozone. Many chemical reaction rates increase with temperature and lead to increased ozone production. Climate change projections show that rising temperatures and water vapour in the atmosphere will likely increase surface ozone in polluted areas like the eastern United States.

On the other hand, ozone concentrations could decrease in a warming climate if anthropogenic ozone-precursor emissions (e.g., nitrogen oxides) continue to decrease through implementation of policies and practices. Therefore, future surface ozone concentrations depend on the climate change mitigation steps taken (more or less methane emissions) as well as air pollution control steps taken.

High surface ozone concentrations often occur during heat waves in the United States. Throughout much of the eastern United States, ozone concentrations during heat waves are at least 20% higher than the summer average. Broadly speaking, surface ozone levels are higher in cities with high levels of air pollution. Ozone pollution in urban areas affects denser populations, and is worsened by high populations of vehicles, which emit pollutants NO_{2} and VOCs, the main contributors to problematic ozone levels.

There is a great deal of evidence to show that surface ozone can harm lung function and irritate the respiratory system. Exposure to ozone (and the pollutants that produce it) is linked to premature death, asthma, bronchitis, heart attack, and other cardiopulmonary problems. High ozone concentrations irritate the lungs and thus affect respiratory function, especially among people with asthma. People who are most at risk from breathing in ozone air pollution are those with respiratory issues, children, older adults and those who typically spend long periods of time outside such as construction workers.

A 2026 UNICEF report on children's climate risk found that children are particularly exposed to rising heat: globally, the most widespread combination of hazards affecting children—droughts, extreme heat and heatwaves—exposes 296 million children, while in France, an estimated 83.6% of children (around 11 million) are exposed to heatwaves, of whom 2.5 million face severe episodes.

== Other health risks ==
=== Health risks from food and water insecurity ===
Climate change affects many aspects of food security through "multiple and interconnected pathways". Many of these are related to the effects of climate change on agriculture, for example failed crops due to more extreme weather events. This comes on top of other coexisting crises that reduce food security in many regions. Less food security means more undernutrition with all its associated health problems. Food insecurity is increasing at the global level (some of the underlying causes are related to climate change, others are not) and about 720–811 million people suffered from hunger in 2020.

The number of deaths resulting from climate change-induced changes to food availability are difficult to estimate. The 2022 IPCC Sixth Assessment Report does not quantify this number in its chapter on food security. A modelling study from 2016 found "a climate change–associated net increase of 529,000 adult deaths worldwide [...] from expected reductions in food availability (particularly fruit and vegetables) by 2050, as compared with a reference scenario without climate change."

A headline finding in 2021 regarding marine food security stated that: "In 2018–20, nearly 70% of countries showed increases in average sea surface temperature in their territorial waters compared within 2003–05, reflecting an increasing threat to their marine food productivity and marine food security". (see also climate change and fisheries).

=== Mental health risks ===
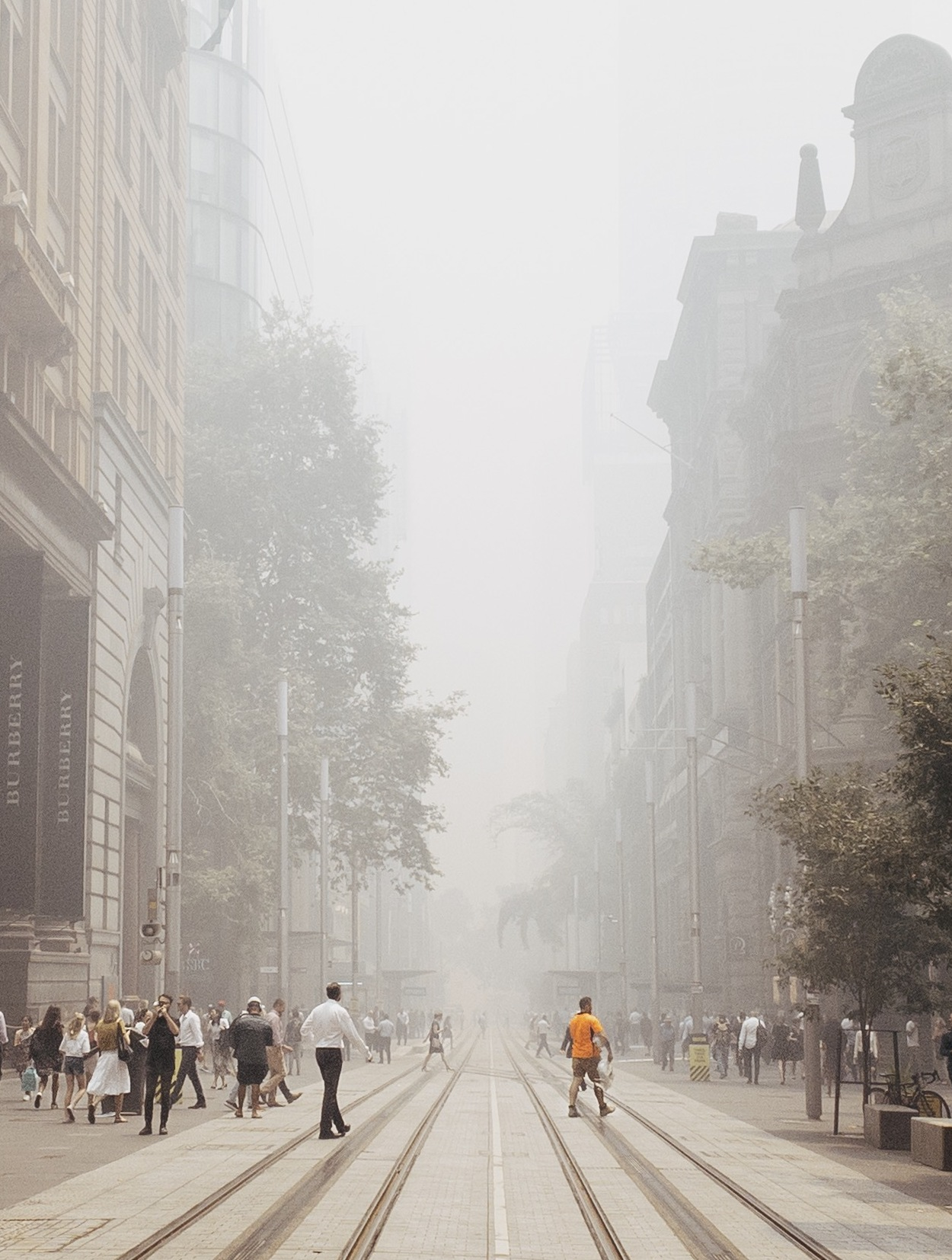
Smoke in Sydney (Australia) from large bushfires in 2019 affected some people's mental health in a direct way. The likelihood of wildfires is increased by climate change.

The psychological impacts of climate change concerns effects that climate change can have on individuals' mental and emotional well-being. They may also relate to more generalized effects on groups and their behaviors, such as the urge to migrate from affected areas of the globe to areas perceived as less affected. These impacts can manifest in various ways and affect people of all ages and backgrounds.

Climate-related hazards can affect mental health in several ways. Exposure to wildfires and other extreme weather events has been associated with post-traumatic stress disorder (PTSD), while flooding and climate-related displacement may contribute to psychological distress and eco-anxiety. Extreme heat has also been associated with adverse mental health outcomes, including increased suicide risk, and heatwaves have been examined in relation to depression. Other reported effects include sleep disturbances following extreme weather events and anxiety associated with air pollution. Additionally it has been estimated that high nighttime temperatures caused about 5% more hours of sleep to be lost worldwide over the previous five years than in 1986-2005. Vulnerable populations, including children, older people, Indigenous communities, women and people whose livelihoods depend on agriculture, may face particular challenges in adapting to the mental health impacts of climate change.

=== Pollen allergies ===
A warming climate can lead to increases of pollen season lengths and concentrations in some regions of the world. For example, in northern mid-latitudes regions, the spring pollen season is now starting earlier. This can affect people with pollen allergies (hay fever). The rise in pollen also comes from rising CO_{2} concentrations in the atmosphere and resulting CO_{2} fertilisation effects.

=== Reduced nutritional value of crops ===
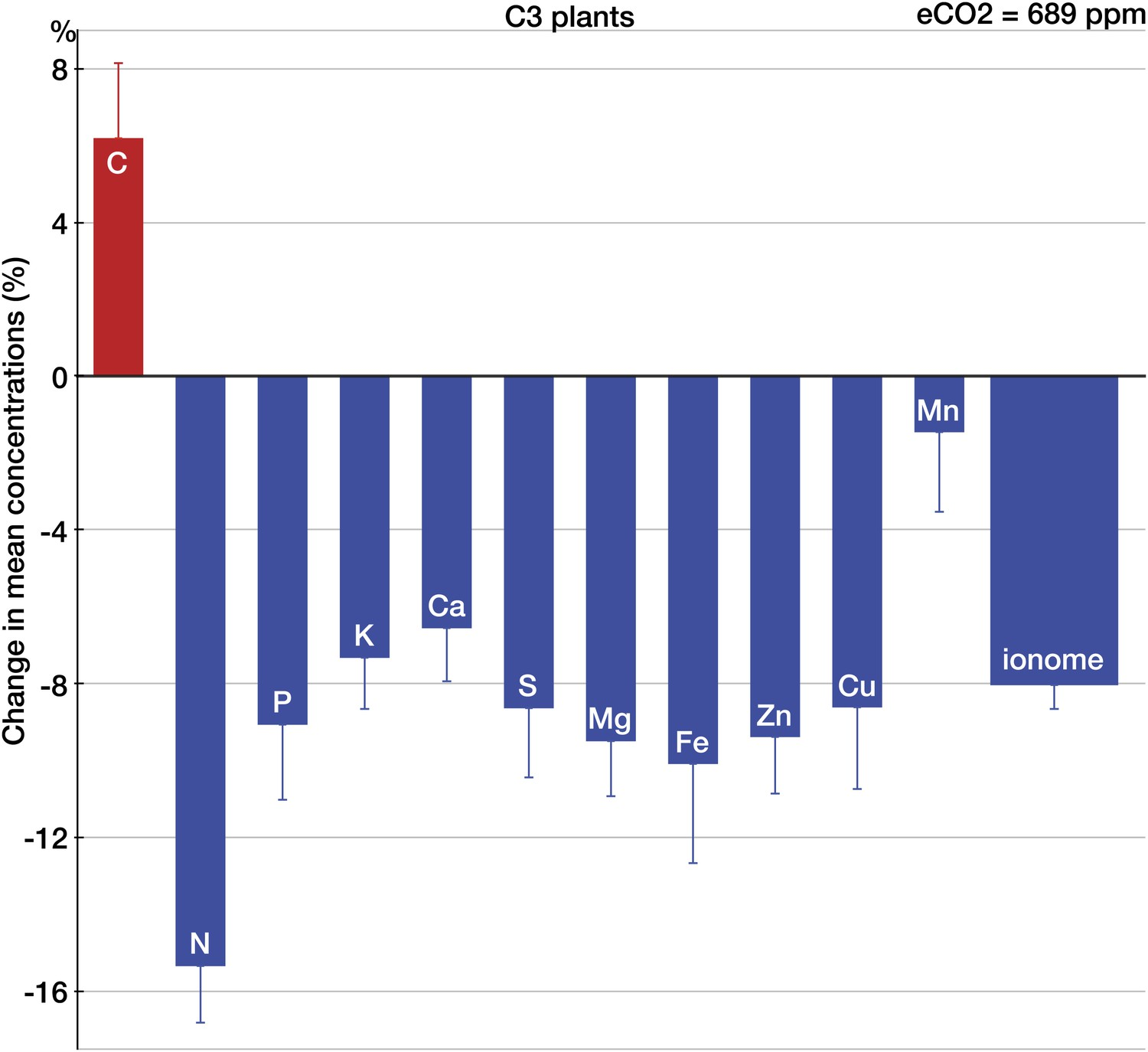
Average decrease of micronutrient density across a range of crops at elevated CO_{2} concentrations, reconstructed from multiple studies through a meta-analysis. The elevated concentration in this figure, 689 ppm, is over 50% greater than the current levels, yet it is expected to be approached under the "mid-range" climate change scenarios, and will be surpassed in the high-emission one.

Changes in atmospheric carbon dioxide may reduce the nutritional quality of some crops, with for instance wheat having less protein and less of some minerals. The nutritional quality of C3 plants (e.g. wheat, oats, rice) is especially at risk: lower levels of protein as well as minerals (for example zinc and iron) are expected. Food crops could see a reduction of protein, iron and zinc content in common food crops of 3 to 17%. This is the projected result of food grown under the expected atmospheric carbon-dioxide levels of 2050. Using data from the UN Food and Agriculture Organization as well as other public sources, the authors analysed 225 different staple foods, such as wheat, rice, maize, vegetables, roots and fruits.

=== Harmful algal blooms in oceans and lakes ===
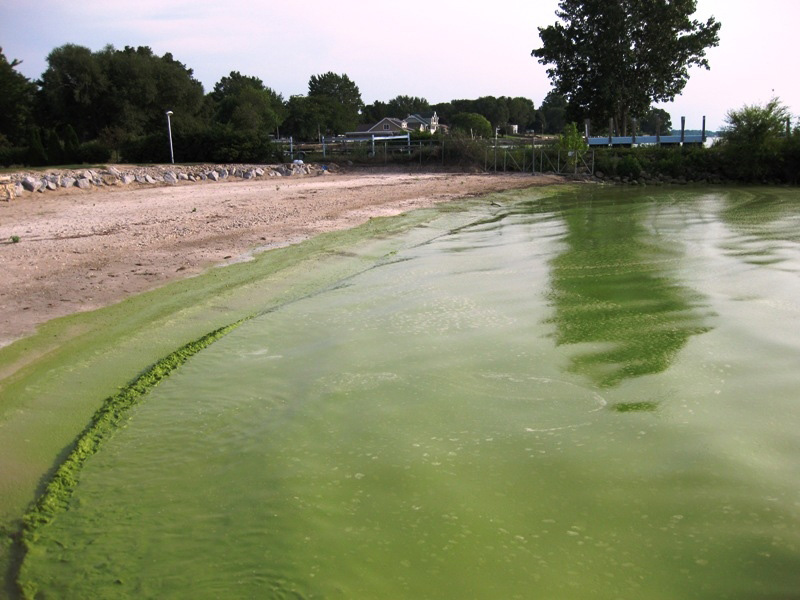
Cyanobacteria (blue-green algae) bloom on Lake Erie (United States) in 2009. These kinds of algae can cause harmful algal blooms.

The warming oceans and lakes are leading to more frequent harmful algal blooms. Also, during droughts, surface waters are even more susceptible to harmful algal blooms and microorganisms. Algal blooms increase water turbidity, suffocating aquatic plants, and can deplete oxygen, killing fish. Some kinds of blue-green algae (cyanobacteria) create neurotoxins, hepatoxins, cytotoxins or endotoxins that can cause serious and sometimes fatal neurological, liver and digestive diseases in humans. Cyanobacteria grow best in warmer temperatures (especially above 25 degrees Celsius), and so climate change makes harmful algal blooms to be more frequent and last longer.

One of these toxin producing algae is Pseudo-nitzschia fraudulenta. This species produces a substance called domoic acid which is responsible for amnesic shellfish poisoning. The toxicity of this species has been shown to increase with greater CO_{2} concentrations associated with ocean acidification. Some of the more common illnesses reported from harmful algal blooms include; Ciguatera fish poisoning, paralytic shellfish poisoning, azaspiracid shellfish poisoning, diarrhetic shellfish poisoning, neurotoxic shellfish poisoning and the above-mentioned amnesic shellfish poisoning.

== Potential health benefits ==
It is possible that a potential health benefit from global warming could result from fewer cold days in winter: This could lead to some mental health benefits. However, the evidence on this correlation is regarded as inconsistent in 2022.

=== Benefits from climate change mitigation and adaptation ===
The potential health benefits (also called "co-benefits") from climate change mitigation and adaptation measures are significant, having been described as "the greatest global health opportunity" of the 21st century. Measures can not only mitigate future health effects from climate change but also improve health directly. Climate change mitigation is interconnected with various co-benefits (such as reduced air pollution and associated health benefits) and how it is carried out (in terms of e.g. policymaking) could also determine its effect on living standards (whether and how inequality and poverty are reduced).

There are many health co-benefits associated with climate action. These include those of cleaner air, healthier diets (e.g. less red meat), more active lifestyles, and increased exposure to green urban spaces. Access to urban green spaces provides benefits to mental health as well.

In the transportation sector mitigation strategies could enable more equitable access to transportation services and reduce congestion. Biking reduces greenhouse gas emissions while reducing the effects of a sedentary lifestyle at the same time. According to PLoS Medicine: "obesity, diabetes, heart disease, and cancer, which are in part related to physical inactivity, may be reduced by a switch to low-carbon transport—including walking and cycling."

Future sustainable pathways scenarios may result in an annual reduction of 1.18 million air pollution-related deaths, 5.86 million diet-related deaths, and 1.15 million deaths due to physical inactivity, across nine countries by 2040. These benefits were attributable to the mitigation of direct greenhouse gas emissions and the accompanying actions that reduce exposure to harmful pollutants, as well as improved diets and safe physical activity. Globally the cost of limiting warming to 2 °C is less than the value of the extra years of life due to cleaner air - and in India and China much less.

Studies suggest that efforts to reduce consumption of goods and services have largely beneficial effects on 18 constituents of well-being.

Addressing inequality can assist with climate change mitigation efforts. Placing health as a key focus of the Nationally Determined Contributions could present an opportunity to increase ambition and realise health co-benefits.

==== Air pollution reduction ====
Air pollution generated by fossil fuel combustion is both a major driver of global warming and the cause of a large number of annual deaths with some estimates as high as 8.7 million excess deaths during 2018. Climate change mitigation policies can lead to lower emissions of co-emitted air pollutants, for instance by shifting away from fossil fuel combustion. Gases such as black carbon and methane contribute both to global warming and to air pollution. Their mitigation can bring benefits in terms of limiting global temperature increases as well as improving air quality. Implementation of the climate pledges made in the run-up to the Paris Agreement could therefore have significant benefits for human health by improving air quality.

The replacement of coal-based energy with renewables can lower the number of premature deaths caused by air pollution and decrease health costs associated with coal-related respiratory diseases. This switch to renewable energy is crucial, as air pollution is responsible for over 13 million deaths annually.

== Global estimates ==
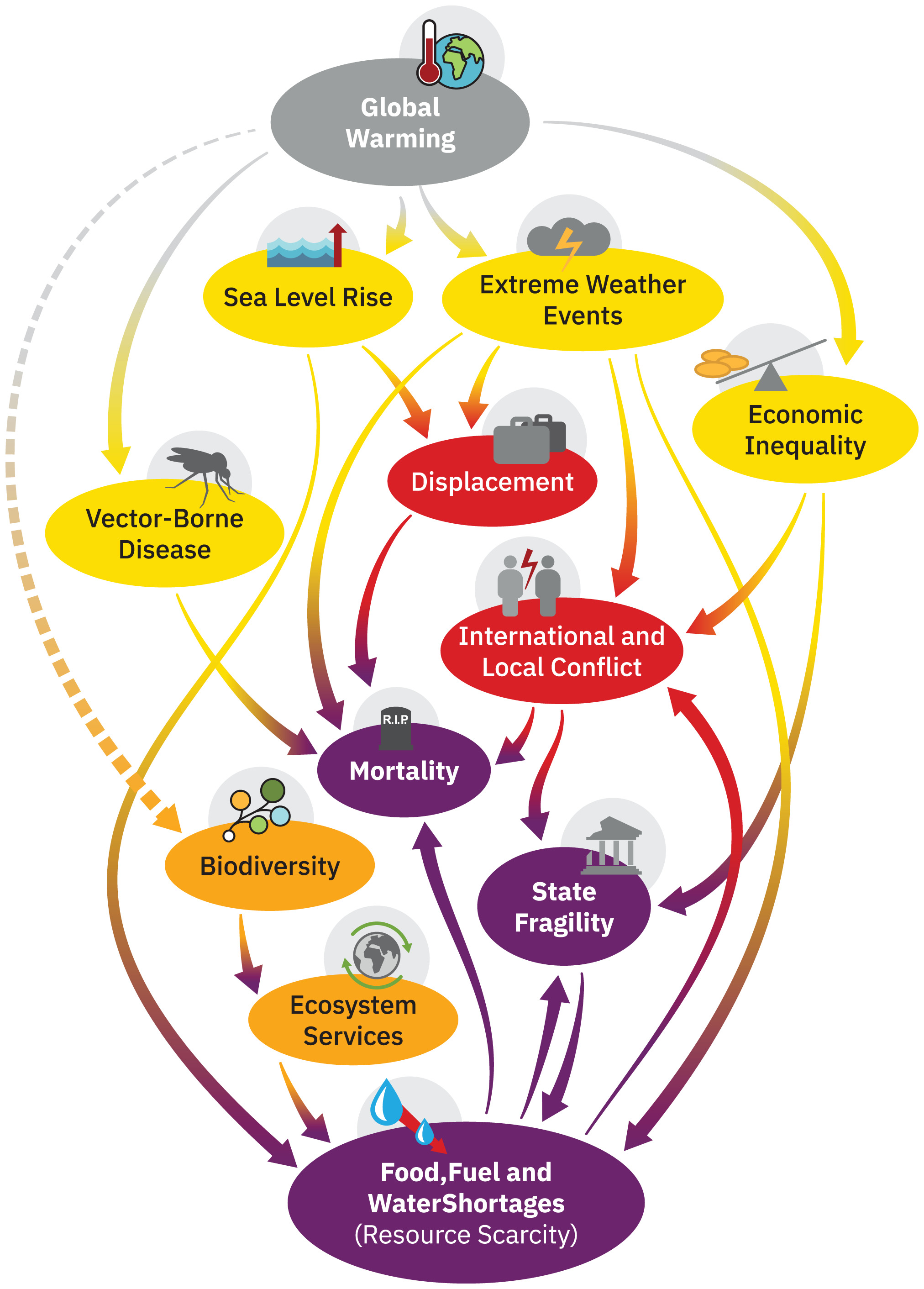
Simplified conceptual causal loop diagram of cascading global climate failure, related to the concept of One Health.

Estimating deaths (mortality) or DALYs (morbidity) from the effects of climate change at the global level is very difficult. A 2014 study by the World Health Organization estimated the effect of climate change on human health, but not all of the effects of climate change were included. For example, the effects of more frequent and extreme storms were excluded. The study assessed deaths from heat exposure in elderly people, increases in diarrhea, malaria, dengue, coastal flooding, and childhood undernutrition. The authors estimated that climate change was projected to cause an additional 250,000 deaths per year between 2030 and 2050 but also stated that "these numbers do not represent a prediction of the overall impacts of climate change on health, since we could not quantify several important causal pathways".

Climate change was responsible for 3% of diarrhoea, 3% of malaria, and 3.8% of dengue fever deaths worldwide in 2004. Total attributable mortality was about 0.2% of deaths in 2004; of these, 85% were child deaths. The effects of more frequent and extreme storms were excluded from this study.

The health effects of climate change are expected to rise in line with projected ongoing global warming for different climate change scenarios. A review found if warming reaches or exceeds 2 °C this century, roughly 1 billion premature deaths would be caused by anthropogenic global warming.

== Society and culture ==
=== Vulnerability ===
A 2021 report published in The Lancet found that climate change does not affect people's health in an equal way. The greatest impact tends to fall on the most vulnerable such as the poor, women, children, the elderly, people with pre-existing health concerns, other minorities and outdoor workers.

Social factors shape health outcomes as people are rendered more or less able to adapt to harms. For example there are "demographic, socioeconomic, housing, health (such as pre-existing health conditions), neighbourhood, and geographical factors" that moderate the effect of climate change on human health.

=== Climate justice and climate migrants ===
Much of the health burden associated with climate change falls on vulnerable people (e.g. indigenous peoples and economically disadvantaged communities). As a result, people of disadvantaged sociodemographic groups experience unequal risks. Often these people will have made a disproportionately low contribution toward man-made global warming, thus leading to concerns over climate justice.

Climate change has diverse effects on migration activities, and can lead to decreases or increases in the number of people who migrate. Migration activities can have an effect on health and well-being, in particular for mental health. Migration in the context of climate change can be grouped into four types: adaptive migration (see also climate change adaptation), involuntary migration, organised relocation of populations, and immobility (which is when people are unable or unwilling to move even though it is recommended).

The observed contribution of climate change to conflict risk is small in comparison with cultural, socioeconomic, and political causes. There is some evidence that rural-to-urban migration within countries worsens the conflict risk in violence prone regions. But there is no evidence that migration between countries would increase the risk of violence.

=== Communication strategies ===
Studies have found that when communicating climate change with the public, it can help encourage engagement if it is framed as a health concern, rather than as an environmental issue. This is especially the case when comparing a health related framing to one that emphasised environmental doom, as was common in the media at least up until 2017. Communicating the co-benefits to health helps underpin greenhouse gas reduction strategies. Safeguarding health—particularly of the most vulnerable—is a frontline local climate change adaptation goal.

=== Connections with public health policies ===
Due to its significant impact on human health, climate change has become a major concern for public health policy. The United States Environmental Protection Agency had issued a 100-page report on global warming and human health back in 1989. By the early years of the 21st century, climate change was increasingly addressed as a public health concern at a global level, for example in 2006 at Nairobi by UN secretary general Kofi Annan. Since 2018, factors such as the 2018 heat wave, the Greta effect and the IPCC's 2018 Special Report on Global Warming of 1.5 °C further increased the urgency for responding to climate change as a global health issue.

The World Bank has suggested a framework that can strengthen health systems to make them more resilient and climate-sensitive.

Placing health as a key focus of the Nationally Determined Contributions could present an opportunity to increase ambition and realize health co-benefits.

In 2019, the Australian Medical Association formally declared climate change as a health emergency.

Research shows that health professionals around the world agree that climate change is real, is caused by humans, and is causing increased health problems in their communities. Health professionals can act by informing people about health harms and ways to address them, by lobbying leaders to take action, and by taking steps to decarbonize their own homes and workplaces.

The European Environment Agency is responding to the continent's heatwave. It said that Europe is not prepared for the growing climate-related health risks from flooding, droughts and extreme heat. It said extreme weather resulted in 240,000 fatalities and EUR 730 billion ($837.5 USD) between 1980 and 2023. To better adapt, it suggests climate-proofing agriculture, energy, and transportation sectors.

== See also ==
- Effects of climate change on human health in Canada
- Effects of climate change on health in the Philippines
- Effects of climate change on health in the United Kingdom
- Effects of climate change
- Environmental health
- Occupational heat stress
- Water security
