= Health inequality in the United Kingdom =

Overview article

There are various factors affecting the health of ethnic minorities in the UK due to health inequalities. The term "BAME" is often used however, the use of this term can be problematic for various reasons, such as an indicating power relations and also having a focus on skin colour. Therefore, this article will use the term ethnic minorities.

Furthermore, there are numerous factors that may be the cause for these inequalities. Amongst these factors are various social determinants which include living in socio-economic disadvantaged neighbourhoods which impacts on having a lack of finances and resources and poor-quality housing. Additionally, psychosocial determinants also have an impact. This includes impact on mental and physical health.

== Diet ==
Early investigation into inequality in the UK centred on the role of diet. The work of John Boyd Orr was influential. In Food, Health and Income he examined diet in relation to income. His conclusion was that "as income increases, disease and death rate decrease, children grow more quickly, adult stature is greater and general health and physique improve."

== Socio-economic status ==
A gradient of inequalities in society exists, there is a relationship between health in England and Wales for those who have socio- economic status in comparison to those who do not. The better a person's position in society, regarding a person's occupation, housing condition and education, the better their health is likely to be. Unemployment has been associated with rates of morbidity and mortality as well as poor work settings. Health inequalities are influence by finances and resources. Inequalities in income impact on health inequalities. The financial situation of a person influences choices that impact on their health, food that they buy as well as choices that they make regarding their lifestyle, such as fitness and exercise.

Individuals living in poorer areas are likely to experience health inequalities which impacts on life span, not only is it likely to impact on life expectancy but it also has an effect on quality of life. Housing and neighbourhood conditions are also crucial determinants of health Factors including pollution and living in damp conditions contributes to respiratory health conditions

== Psychosocial determinants ==
There are also direct and indirect effects of stress that contribute to health inequalities High income countries and the social hierarchy is linked to health outcomes

Individuals who experience poor quality of education, low paid occupations in poor settings, poor housing are more likely to suffer from stress. The longer they are in these situations of disadvantage the more likely they are to suffer mentally.

In contrast to this, there is also research conducted within the UK indicates that in fact ethnic minorities have better mental well-being due to cultural factors that enable individuals to have more support, including strong family relations.

However, due to vast research indicating the impact of social structural determinants on mental wellbeing and due to recent the social inequalities within the UK being further exacerbated due to the COVID-19 pandemic this research is ongoing

== COVID-19 ==
The spread of the COVID-19 virus has impacted the lives of ethnic minority groups in the United Kingdom. Ethnic groups have been found to be at a higher risk of certain health conditions and, according to the 1999 Health Survey for England, minorities are more likely to report unfavorable health status in comparison to the majority population. In addition, minorities have a higher risk of contracting the virus due in part to living and working in more dangerous conditions than the White population in the UK.

These factors indicated an increased chance of ethnic minorities having worse reactions after being infected with COVID-19 than other ethnic groups. This conclusion was confirmed and reflected in mortality studies that reveal ethnic groups have up to a 50% greater chance of dying from the virus in comparison to the White British population.

At lower-level occupational fields that are more likely to have contact with infected individuals, 20% of the workers are part of a minority. Ethnic minorities were also at a greater risk of losing their job, leading to financial struggles. When comparing the living condition of minorities versus the majority population, it has been reported that minorities are living in more crowded homes. Overcrowded homes make it easier for COVID-19 to spread among the community, which increases the negative impact and outcomes of the virus within minority groups.

The previous encounters of minorities with the health system in the UK have also impacted the lives of many during the pandemic. Further study has proven that minorities have claimed to have unpleasant experiences with public healthcare as opposed to other ethnic groups. The Unfavorable experiences of ethnic groups have led to a decrease in the presence of ethnic minorities in hospitals. Overall, the pandemic has had a negative measurable effect on the ethnic minorities in the UK.

== Interventions ==
England aimed to introduce interventions to reduce health inequalities, the strategy was based on two steps. In 1999, the first step which involved the Department of Health publishing "Reducing health inequalities: an action inequalities in Health", which was the governments response to recommendations made in the "independent inquiry into inequalities in Health". This included various government policies such as introducing "Health Action Zones", higher pensions, urban housing regeneration and national minimum wage. This was followed by the second step of reducing health inequalities in 2003, "Tackling health inequalities: a program for Action" was published which consisted of targets that were aimed to be achieved by 2010. This programme included various interventions which were aimed at improving the quality of housing and managing risks of poor health by introducing interventions focusing on diet and physical activity. The interventions were effective however the health inequalities were not reduced in terms of infant mortality or life expectancy. Amongst some of the issues were that the interventions were not conducted on a large enough scale to have this impact.

== See also ==
- Effects of climate change on health in the United Kingdom
