= Human climate niche =

The human climate niche is the ensemble of climate conditions that have sustained human life and human activities, like agriculture, on the globe for the last millennia. The human climate niche is estimated by calculating the human population density with respect to mean annual temperature. The human population distribution as a function of mean annual temperature is bimodal and results in two modes; one at 15 °C and another one at ~20 to 25 °C. Crops and livestock required for sustaining the human population are also limited to the similar niche conditions. Given the rise in mean global temperatures, the human population is projected to experience climate conditions beyond the human climate niche. Some projections show that considering temperature and demographic changes, 2.0 and 3.7 billion people will live in out-of-the-niche areas by 2030 and 2090, respectively.

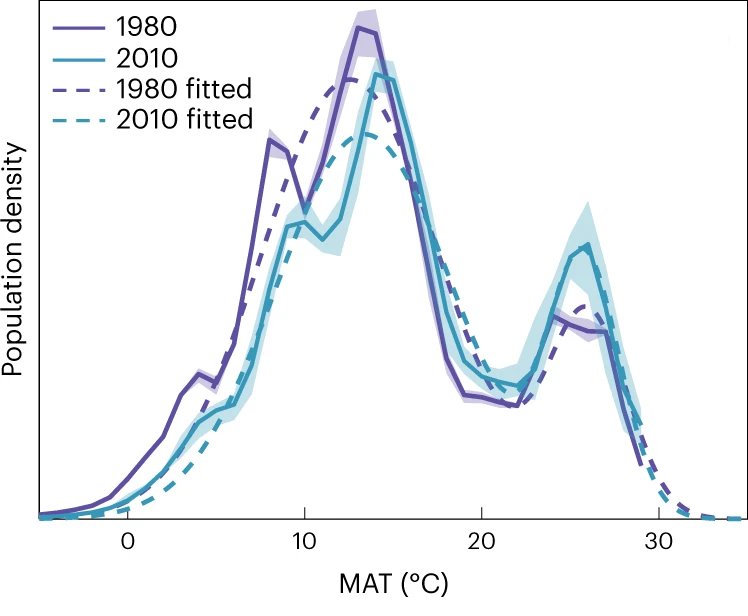
Changes in relative human population density with respect to mean annual temperature.

== Historical stability ==
Xu et al. (2020) used the HYDE (History Database of the Global Environment) database for recent centuries and the ArchaeoGLOBE archaeological database for deeper history to map the distribution of human population density against mean annual temperature (MAT) from 6,000 years before present to the present day. The analysis found that this bimodal distribution has remained "largely unaltered" across six millennia, despite enormous technological, social, and demographic transformations. The primary mode, at approximately 13 °C, corresponds to the temperate climates where the highest average population densities have concentrated throughout recorded history. A secondary mode, associated principally with monsoon climates in South Asia, appears at approximately 27 °C.

Independent analyses have found that agricultural production of crops and livestock, as well as GDP per capita, peak within the same temperature band, suggesting the niche reflects biophysical constraints rather than mere historical path dependence.

Conditions with MAT at or above 29 °C currently cover only 0.8% of the global land surface, mostly in the Sahara.

== Climate change projections ==
Under the business-as-usual emissions scenario (RCP 8.5) combined with continued population growth (SSP3), Xu et al. projected that by 2070 the geographic area experiencing MAT of 29 °C or above would expand from 0.8% to approximately 19% of the global land surface. Approximately 3.5 billion people, roughly 30% of the projected 2070 global population, would find themselves in MAT conditions currently found only in the hottest parts of the Sahara. Under strong climate mitigation (RCP 2.6), the number drops to approximately 1.5 billion.

The authors summarized this as approximately one billion people displaced from the niche per degree Celsius of global mean temperature increase. The projected geographic shift of the temperature niche over the next 50 years would exceed the total shift of the previous 6,000 years.

A 2023 follow-up study by Lenton, Xu, and colleagues published in Nature Sustainability refined the projections. They found that climate change had already placed approximately 9% of the global population (over 600 million people) outside the historical niche. At 2.7 °C of warming, the current policy trajectory, 22 to 39% of the global population would be exposed to unprecedented heat. Limiting warming to 1.5 °C would reduce the population exposed to extreme heat by approximately fivefold compared to the 2.7 °C scenario.

== Authors ==
The original 2020 study was authored by Chi Xu (Nanjing University), Timothy A. Kohler (Washington State University and Santa Fe Institute), Timothy M. Lenton (University of Exeter, Global Systems Institute), Jens-Christian Svenning (Aarhus University), and Marten Scheffer (Wageningen University and Santa Fe Institute).

== Critiques and refinements ==
Klinger and Ryan (2022) confirmed that average population densities are higher in the temperate band (10–20 °C) but noted that the warm range (20–30 °C) contains a greater total population and more land area with high population densities. They concluded that "human habitation patterns do not give a clear indication of whether warm or temperate temperature bands are more suitable for humans," suggesting the niche may be broader and warmer than characterized by Xu et al.

Richard S. J. Tol (2024) argued that Xu et al.'s estimate of the human climate envelope is biased because the original authors removed the extreme 1% of data without correcting for this censoring. Using alternative statistical methods, Tol found the number of people threatened to be "hundreds of millions rather than billions," though he confirmed the thin tail of human temperature tolerance at the hot end, indicating that temperature increases pose particular danger.

Mark Maslin of University College London characterized the original paper as "a brilliant thought experiment" but criticized its emphasis on the worst-case RCP 8.5 scenario and argued that it "does not take account of the dynamic and adaptable nature of human technology and society."

== Implications for climate migration ==
The human climate niche framework has become a tool for quantifying the scale of potential climate migration. At current trajectories, one billion people displaced over fifty years implies approximately 20 million climate migrants per year. The most affected regions, Sub-Saharan Africa, South Asia, the Persian Gulf, and the Sahel, overlap substantially with areas most exposed to sea level rise.

== See also ==
- Climate change and agriculture
- Climate migration
- Effects of climate change on humans
- Wet-bulb temperature
- Tipping points in the climate system
