= Timothy A. Kohler =

American archaeologist and anthropologist

Timothy Alan Kohler
- Born: Timothy Alan Kohler; Davenport, Iowa, U.S.
- Citizenship: American
- Education: New College of Florida (A.B.); University of Florida (M.A., Ph.D.)
- Known for: Archaeology of the Pueblo Southwest; long-term economic inequality; agent-based and computational modeling
- Notable work: Ten Thousand Years of Inequality (2018)
- Awards: Alfred Vincent Kidder Award (2014); Society for American Archaeology Award for Excellence in Archaeological Analysis (2010)
- Honors: Member, United States National Academy of Sciences; Fellow, American Association for the Advancement of Science
- Scientific career
- Fields: Archaeology; Evolutionary anthropology
- Institutions: Washington State University; Santa Fe Institute
- Academic advisors: Jerald T. Milanich

Timothy Alan Kohler is an American archaeologist and evolutionary anthropologist known for his research on the prehistory of the North American Southwest, long-term economic inequality, and the application of computational and agent-based modeling to human–environment interactions. He is Regents’ Professor Emeritus of Anthropology at Washington State University (WSU) and an External Professor at the Santa Fe Institute (SFI).

Kohler is a member of the United States National Academy of Sciences and a Fellow of the American Association for the Advancement of Science (AAAS). He has led or co-led major research programs funded by the National Science Foundation, including the Village Ecodynamics Project (I and II) and the Global Dynamics of Inequality (GINI) Project. His work integrates field archaeology, quantitative modeling, and comparative analysis of long-term social change.

== Early life and education ==
Kohler was born in Davenport, Iowa, the youngest of three sons. His father owned a retail and wholesale bakery (Dad's Cookie Company), and his mother worked as a librarian. He earned an A.B. in General Studies from New College of Florida in 1972. He completed an M.A. in anthropology at the University of Florida in 1975, with a major in archaeology and a minor in botany; his master's thesis examined a Weeden Island village and ceremonial site in coastal Florida.

In 1978, Kohler received his Ph.D. in anthropology from the University of Florida. His dissertation, The Social and Chronological Dimensions of Village Occupation at a North Florida Weeden Island Period Site, analyzed settlement patterns and chronology in a pre-Columbian Woodland-period village. A synopsis of this research appeared in McKeithen Weeden Island: The Culture of Northern Florida, A.D. 200–900 (1984), edited by Jerald T. Milanich and colleagues.

== Academic career ==
Kohler began his academic career as an instructor in the Department of Anthropology at the University of Florida in 1978. Later that year, he joined Washington State University as an assistant professor, becoming a permanent faculty member in 1980. Shortly after arriving at WSU, he joined colleague William D. Lipe in the Dolores Archaeological Program in southwestern Colorado. He was promoted to associate professor in 1986 and to full professor in 1993. He married fellow WSU faculty member Marilyn Von Seggern in 1982. They have two children, Claire (b. 1985) and Sander (b. 1988).

At WSU, Kohler served as chair of the Department of Anthropology from 1996 to 2000 and as acting chair from 2004 to 2005. In 2006, he was appointed Regents’ Professor, and in 2021 he became Regents’ Professor Emeritus.

Outside WSU, Kohler has held a number of visiting and honorary appointments, including Weatherhead Scholar at the School of American Research (1986–1987), Fulbright–University of Calgary Chair in North American Studies (1999), professeur invité at the Université de Franche-Comté in Besançon (2013), invited scholar at the Research Institute for Humanity and Nature in Kyoto (2019), Johanna-Mestorf-Chair at Christian-Albrechts-Universität zu Kiel (2021), and research associate in the Department of Archaeology at Durham University (2023).

At the Santa Fe Institute, Kohler has been a member since 1992 and an External Professor since 1994. He directed the Culture (Long-Term Human Dynamics) Program from 1997 to 1999 and served on the SFI Science Board from 2011 to 2017.

== Research ==
=== Archaeology of the Pueblo Southwest ===
Kohler is best known for his research on the prehispanic history of the Pueblo peoples of the southwestern United States, particularly in the Mesa Verde and northern Rio Grande regions. His work combines archaeological field data with computational modeling to analyze settlement dynamics, climate variability, and social organization.

He has participated in major field projects, including the Bandelier Archaeological Excavation Project and the Dolores Archaeological Program. His research addresses population aggregation, resource use, social hierarchy, and resilience in prehispanic agricultural societies.

In collaboration with graduate students, Kohler has contributed to understanding climate variability in the North American Southwest and its effects on ancient Pueblo societies. This work includes reconstructions of high-frequency variability using tree-ring data as well as low-frequency variability using pollen records.

=== Inequality and long-term social change ===
A central theme of Kohler's scholarship is the deep history of economic inequality. He co-edited, with Michael E. Smith, Ten Thousand Years of Inequality: The Archaeology of Wealth Differences (2018), which examines long-term patterns of wealth disparity across multiple world regions.

Kohler has also played a leading role in the Global Dynamics of Inequality (GINI) Project, an international collaborative effort analyzing archaeological housing data as a proxy for economic growth and wealth inequality. In 2025, the GINI Project was recognized by the Shanghai Archaeology Forum as one of ten major archaeological research findings.

=== Computational and agent-based modeling ===
Kohler has been a pioneer in applying agent-based modeling and complex systems approaches to archaeology. He has published in interdisciplinary journals including Nature, Nature Communications, Proceedings of the National Academy of Sciences, Science Advances, and Trends in Ecology & Evolution. He has also contributed to methodological tools such as SKOPE, a platform for modeling human–environment interactions, and YesWorkflow, a system for documenting computational workflows.

== Honors and awards ==
Kohler's honors include election to the United States National Academy of Sciences (2022; inducted 2023), the Alfred Vincent Kidder Award for Eminence in American Archaeology (2014), the Society for American Archaeology Award for Excellence in Archaeological Analysis (2010), election as a Fellow of the American Association for the Advancement of Science (2007), and election to the Washington State Academy of Sciences (2018). He also received the Society for American Archaeology Presidential Recognition Award (2019), and his projects have been recognized by the Shanghai Archaeology Forum.

== Selected publications ==
- Kohler, T. A.; Smith, M. E.; et al. (2017). “Greater Post-Neolithic Wealth Disparities in Eurasia than in North or Mesoamerica.” Nature 551: 619–622. doi:10.1038/nature24646.
- Kohler, T. A.; Scheffer, M.; et al. (2021). “Loss of Resilience Preceded Transformation of Prehispanic Pueblo Societies.” Proceedings of the National Academy of Sciences 118 (18): e2024397118. doi:10.1073/pnas.2024397118.
- Kohler, T. A.; Bird, D.; Wolpert, D. H. (2022). “Social Scale and Collective Computation: Does Information Processing Limit Rate of Growth in Scale?” Journal of Social Computing 3 (1): 1–17. doi:10.23919/JSC.2021.0020.
- Kohler, T. A.; Brumbaugh, L. E.; Bocinsky, R. K. (2025). “How Many People Lived in the Chaco Regional System, and Why It Matters.” Kiva 91 (4): 361–391. doi:10.1080/00231940.2025.2553441.
- Kohler, T. A.; Green, A.; Ortman, S. G. (2026). “Kuznets at −7000: Is There a Really Long-Term Relationship between Growth and Inequality?” Structural Change and Economic Dynamics. doi:10.1016/j.strueco.2026.01.007.
