= Effects of climate change on health in the United Kingdom =

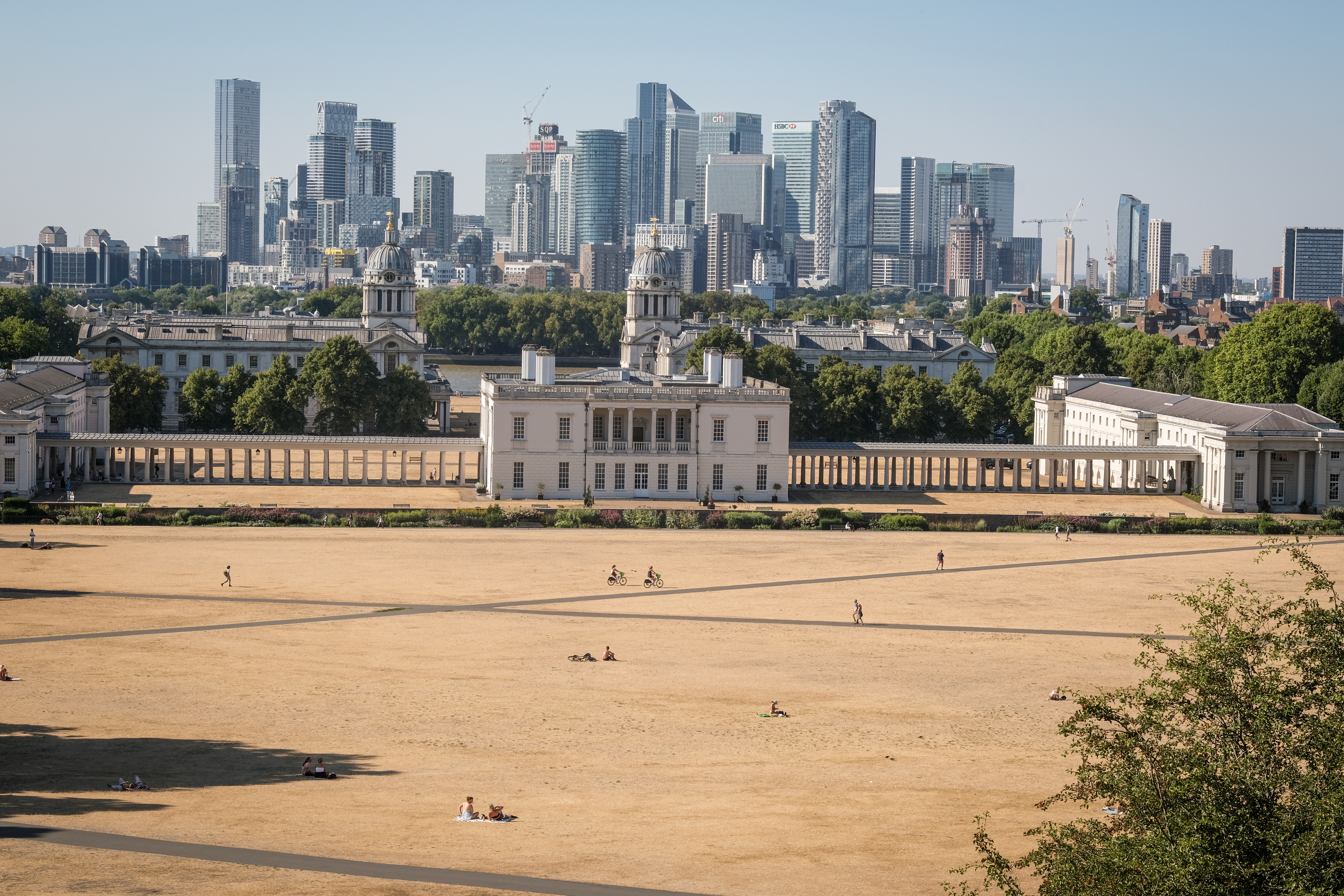
Scorched grass in London during the 2022 heatwaves.

Climate change has already affected the physical and mental health of people in the United Kingdom. The country's climate is becoming warmer, with drier summers and wetter winters. Health threats due to climate change in the UK include heatwaves, floods, storms, air pollution and new infectious diseases, among others.

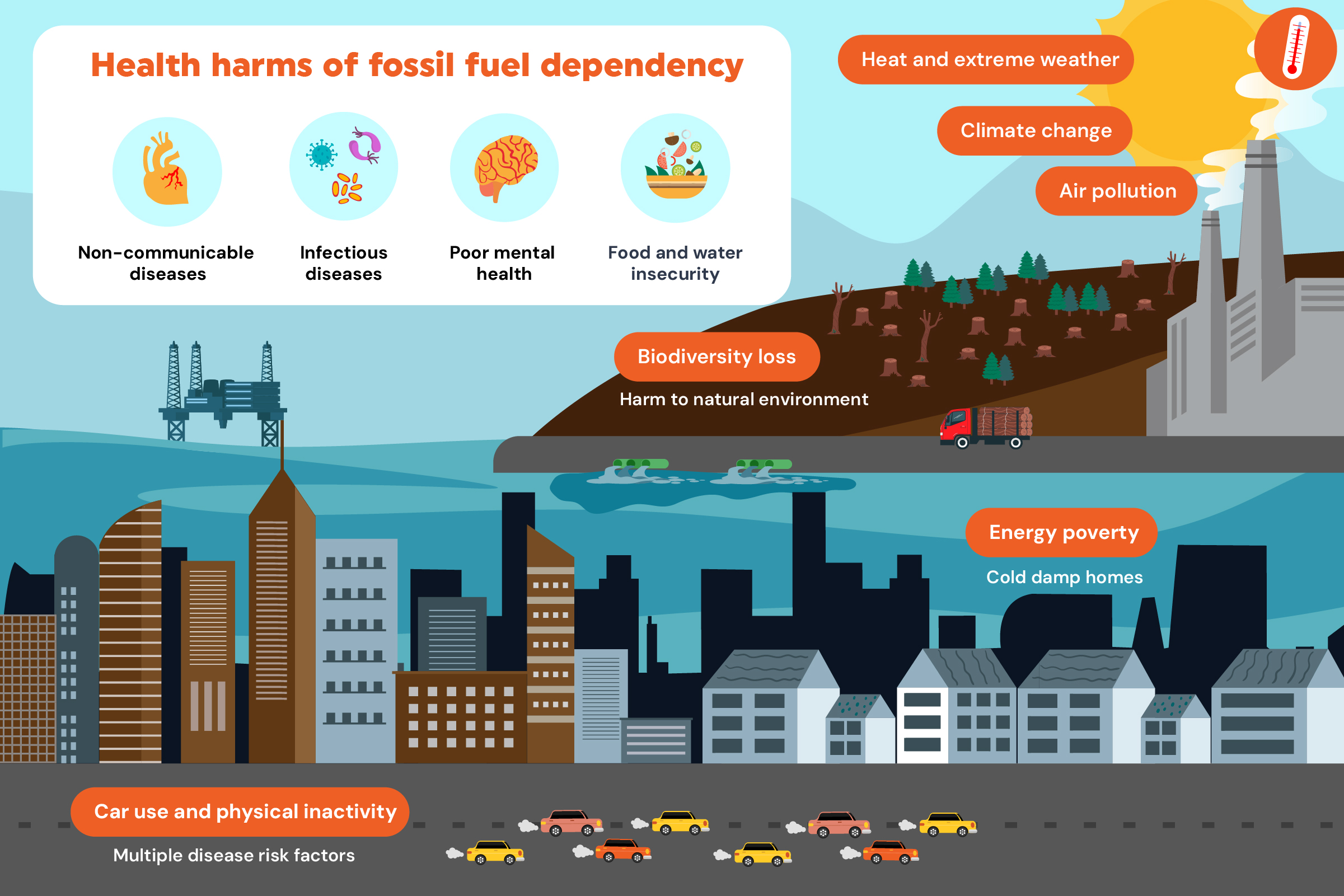
Health harms of fossil fuel dependency.

Extreme heat waves have contributed to thousands of deaths per summer, especially in cities. Without climate change mitigation or adaptation, heat-related deaths could increase sixfold by the 2050s, particularly affecting children, the elderly and people with pre-existing conditions. Heat events also strain healthcare systems, leading to surges in emergency visits and exposing gaps in infrastructure.

Flooding in the UK presents another major threat, currently affecting over six million people, with this number expected to rise significantly as temperatures increase. Beyond physical risks, floods have severe long-lasting mental health consequences, including post-traumatic stress disorder (PTSD). Climate change also facilitates the spread of diseases like Lyme disease and leptospirosis through warming temperatures and habitat changes that bring humans into closer contact with disease-carrying organisms.

Climate change is also affecting indoor and outdoor air quality in the UK such as contributing to longer allergy seasons in the UK and by contributing to mould growth and an increase in pollens and other pollutants, affecting respiratory and cardiovascular health. Additionally, climate disruptions to food systems reduce crop yields, increase reliance on imports, and raise food costs, disproportionately affecting low-income households and contributing to poor diets, obesity, and related illnesses. Mental health is also heavily impacted, with extreme weather and climate change anxiety driving distress, particularly among younger populations.

The UK is working toward net-zero emissions by 2050, focusing on decarbonizing energy, transport, and housing. The National Health Service (NHS) is implementing resilience measures to address climate-related health challenges, while nature-based solutions like urban greening mitigate impacts. However, health inequalities, particularly in low-income communities, exacerbate vulnerability to climate risks. Addressing these disparities is crucial to ensuring equitable health outcomes as the country confronts the growing impacts of climate change.

== Changes to UK climate ==
The weather and climate of the United Kingdom has already been affected by human-caused climate change. The country's climate is becoming warmer, with drier summers and wetter winters. The frequency and intensity of storms, floods, droughts and heatwaves is increasing, and sea level rise is impacting coastal areas. This trend is expected to continue.

Heat events are becoming longer, more frequent and intense. Due to climate change, 2023 was the UK's second warmest year with the warmest June on record and a September heatwave.

== Extreme weather ==
=== Heat ===
The United Kingdom has experienced a significant increase in severe heat waves. Increasingly intense and prolonged heat periods can have dire health consequences. Extreme heat has already caused the death of people who would not have died without these weather events, especially in cities. In England, over the past two decades there were an increasing number of deaths due to heat-related causes. For instance, 2,985 all-cause excess deaths – meaning people who are not expected to die during this period – were recorded during the heatwaves of 2022 in England.

Without climate change mitigation or adaptation measures, heat deaths are projected to increase in the UK due to a combination of climate change and the ageing of population. The risk of heat-related death increases with age. With no additional adaptation and limited global decarbonisation, heat-related deaths could increase nearly 6-fold from an estimated average of 1,602 deaths per year in the 2007-2018 period to 10,889 deaths per year in the 2050s. It is estimated that each 1°C rise in mean temperature is associated with an 18% increased risk of heat-related illness and 35% increased risk of heat-related death.

Current knowledge regarding the number of heat-related deaths and hospital admissions for UK nations other than England is very limited. In Northern Ireland, it is estimated that there are 30 estimated heat-related deaths per year. In Scotland there are 70 estimated heat-related deaths per year. It is also assumed that impacts in southern Scotland may be similar to those observed in northern England. In Wales, there are no official reports or mortality numbers of recent heatwaves, but there are 110 estimated heat-related deaths per year. The number of deaths from heat are expected to rise in Scotland, Northern Ireland and Wales.

Although heat has a negative impact on the health of the entire population, some factors may increase the risk of adverse outcomes. People who are at an increased risk of dying from heat exposure include the elderly, young children, those who have low socioeconomic status or pre-existing diseases. People over 65 have the highest risk of death. The UK has an ageing population, which could contribute to increasing number of deaths related to heat over time.

Extended periods of heat exposure can cause an elevated risk of death from pre-existing cardiovascular (affecting the heart) and cerebrovascular diseases (affecting the brain). Extreme heat can cause a 17% increase in the risk of death due to cardiovascular disease, especially stroke and coronary heart disease. Women and over 65-year-olds are particularly vulnerable to heat-related cardiovascular disease and death. At the same time being exposed to heat does not cause the development of new cardiovascular and cerebrovascular diseases in itself.

Extreme heat could also cause a 14% increase in the risk of dying for people with diabetes. Heatwaves lasting for 3 or more consecutive days are also associated with a 6% increase in the risk of the development or worsening of a broad range of mental health conditions.

Although taking medications (particularly those influencing body's heat regulation and the stability of the cardiovascular system) are potential risk factors for heat-related death, their exact impact is not known.

In addition, heat events are causing significant disruption to the National Health Service (NHS). There is a significant increase in A&E attendances due to heat stroke during heat periods. At the same time experts are uncertain about the exact impact of heat on the number of hospital admissions. Emergency admissions between 2001 and 2012 increased because of extreme heat, especially among older and socioeconomically deprived groups. In Greater London between 1994 and 2000 there were heat-related increases in emergency admissions for respiratory and kidney diseases, in children under 5, and for respiratory diseases in over 75-year-olds. At the same time this happened without an overall increase in hospital admissions perhaps due to bed capacity. The substantial increase in the number of deaths without a comparable increase in hospital admissions might be explained by rapid deterioration that prevents vulnerable individuals from asking for help or getting to a hospital before dying.

Information regarding how heat impacts people who are already in medical facilities (inpatients) is limited. For instance, the heat events in 2020 caused significant increases in hospital deaths, but the underlying causes and risk factors for these excess deaths remain unknown. Competing priorities, inappropriate facilities and equipment to cope with heat may all contribute to excess deaths in NHS hospitals.

Different regions in the UK can be impacted by heat to a different degree. Regional differences might be due to differences in day and night-time temperatures, other environmental conditions, or population characteristics.

The natural and built environment influences the temperature experienced indoors and outdoors. In Greater London in 2007-2016 temperatures were higher in neighbourhoods with lower levels of urban vegetation and with higher levels of income deprivation, social housing, and non-native English speakers. The number of heat-related deaths increased by about 3% for each 1°C increase in temperature. Vegetation cover afforded the largest reduction in the risk of heat-related death. Based on heatwaves in the West Midlands in 2003-2006, it is estimated that reflective "cool" roofs could significantly reduce temperatures by 0.3°C (about 23% of the urban heat island effect).

Besides changes in the environment, individual protective behaviours can also reduce the health consequences of heat. These behaviours include using fans, drinking water, immersing feet and hands in cold water. However, recent public health messages about risk and protective behaviours may not be reaching the most heat-vulnerable people. During the level 3 heat-health alert in England in 2017 most heat-vulnerable did not consider themselves at risk and were unaware of protective behaviours. Only 25% reported changing their behaviour in response to hot weather-related health advice. Many vulnerable adults were more concerned about the effects of the ultra-violet radiation on the skin than the health effects of hot temperatures.

Older people, men, lower income groups and those with lower education levels might be less likely to adopt personal protective behaviours. A survey by the British Red Cross in 2023 reported that the public acknowledges that many people lack information about their risk and are unprepared to cope with heat events, particularly those who are likely to be the most vulnerable.

Based on a 2022 survey, rising UK temperatures are the biggest impact of climate change that most British adults expect to experience by 2030. Furthermore, 62% of adults in the UK are concerned about the impact of heat events on themselves.

In the future the vulnerability of the British population to heat will depend on the ability to implement strategies for effective, sustainable, and equitable adaptation, which requires behaviour change by policy makers, service providers and individuals. The ageing population and the increasing prevalence of chronic diseases, particularly multimorbidity, will exacerbate the impact of climate change, making people more vulnerable to extreme temperatures. Therefore, public health policies and behaviour change interventions that promote healthy ageing and reduce risk factors for chronic diseases might improve heat resilience of the UK population.

=== Floods ===
Flooding represents one of the most serious impacts of climate change in the UK, particularly for England. Currently more than 6 million people are at risk of flooding due to where they live. This is expected to rise 61% by 2050 with a modest warming of climate (2°C). If temperatures rise more (4°C), 118% more people will be threatened by flooding. Climate change has increased the intensity of storms in the UK, making them more likely to produce heavy rainfall. These extreme weather events create more damaging floods.

Besides threatening physical health, experiencing flooding also has a negative impact on mental health. More than a third of people who experienced flooding in England in 2013/14 had post-traumatic stress disorder a year after, while around 20-25% developed anxiety disorders or depression. For many, the psychological symptoms persisted for years after the floods.

=== Wildfires ===
Wildfires refer to an uncontrolled fire of vegetation where a decision is required whether to suppress it. The UK has two fire seasons: spring and mid-late summer. Climate change is expected to significantly increase the number of days with a very high risk of wildfires, especially in the summer season.

=== Chemicals ===
Various chemicals can be found in the environment, for example in the atmosphere, in water, soil, sediment and in living organisms. Changes in temperature, precipitation, humidity, wind conditions, erosion and extreme weather events due to climate change will affect the fate and behaviour of such chemicals. Climate change is likely to increase the release of chemicals, including contaminants from melting polar ice and high-altitude glaciers (which trap harmful chemicals). There is also likely to be increased release of chemicals due to higher temperatures and reduced precipitation, which can make persistent organic pollutants (POPs) and pesticides turn into gas and get into the atmosphere and potentially increase air pollution.

== Climate-sensitive infectious diseases ==
=== Vector-borne ===
Vector-borne diseases are infections caused by parasites, viruses and bacteria which are carried by animals (called vectors). Animal vectors are most commonly arthropods such as mosquitoes, ticks, midges, sand-flies and fleas. Interaction with these animal vectors may cause the infection to be transmitted to humans and other animals. The most common vector-borne disease in the UK is Lyme disease which is carried by ticks.

Because most vectors are insects and therefore cold-blooded they need external sources of heat and are directly affected by changes in the weather or climate. Warmer temperatures can lead to faster development of both the vector and the infectious agents that it transmits, increased survival, increased biting rate, and longer periods of the year when the vector is active. Geographical distributions of some vectors seem likely to expand due to climate change. Places in the UK that were historically unsuitable habitat for specific vectors include higher altitude and higher latitude areas. These may become more suitable because of higher ambient temperature, or if more breeding habitat becomes available. Additional breeding habitat can be created for example by heavy rainfall that leads to more pools of stagnant water that mosquitos need for breeding. Furthermore, vectors can live in more places if winter temperatures do not drop below the minimum that vectors can survive.

Climate change may also directly or indirectly cause changes in land use or biodiversity. These changes can destroy or create habitats that bring people into closer or more frequent contact with environments that have disease vectors.

Besides humans, changes due to climate change in the UK in vector-borne disease infection rates may harm livestock, wildlife and pets as well.

== Changes in air quality ==
=== Outdoors ===
Allergies triggered by spores or pollen affect 11% of the UK population. Due to climate change, the season for some of these allergens might occur earlier and for some it might be more severe.

=== Indoors ===
Milder winters can lead to increased levels of biological contaminants like house dust mite and fungi. Flooding can also lead to the presence of mould such as Cladosporium, Aspergillus, Penicillium, Alternaria, and Stachybotrys fungi in flooded dwellings, which can cause respiratory issues. Climate change can impact indoor pollutant levels by influencing people's behavior. For instance, during hotter summers, people may open windows more often, which alters ventilation and allows outdoor pollutants to enter.

If not properly installed, measures to improve housing energy efficiency, such as increased air tightness, can inadvertently lead to reduced air quality by trapping pollutants indoors. Poor ventilation can also exacerbate issues caused by biological contaminants, such as mould, leading to respiratory and cardiovascular problems.

== Food and water ==
=== Food insecurity ===
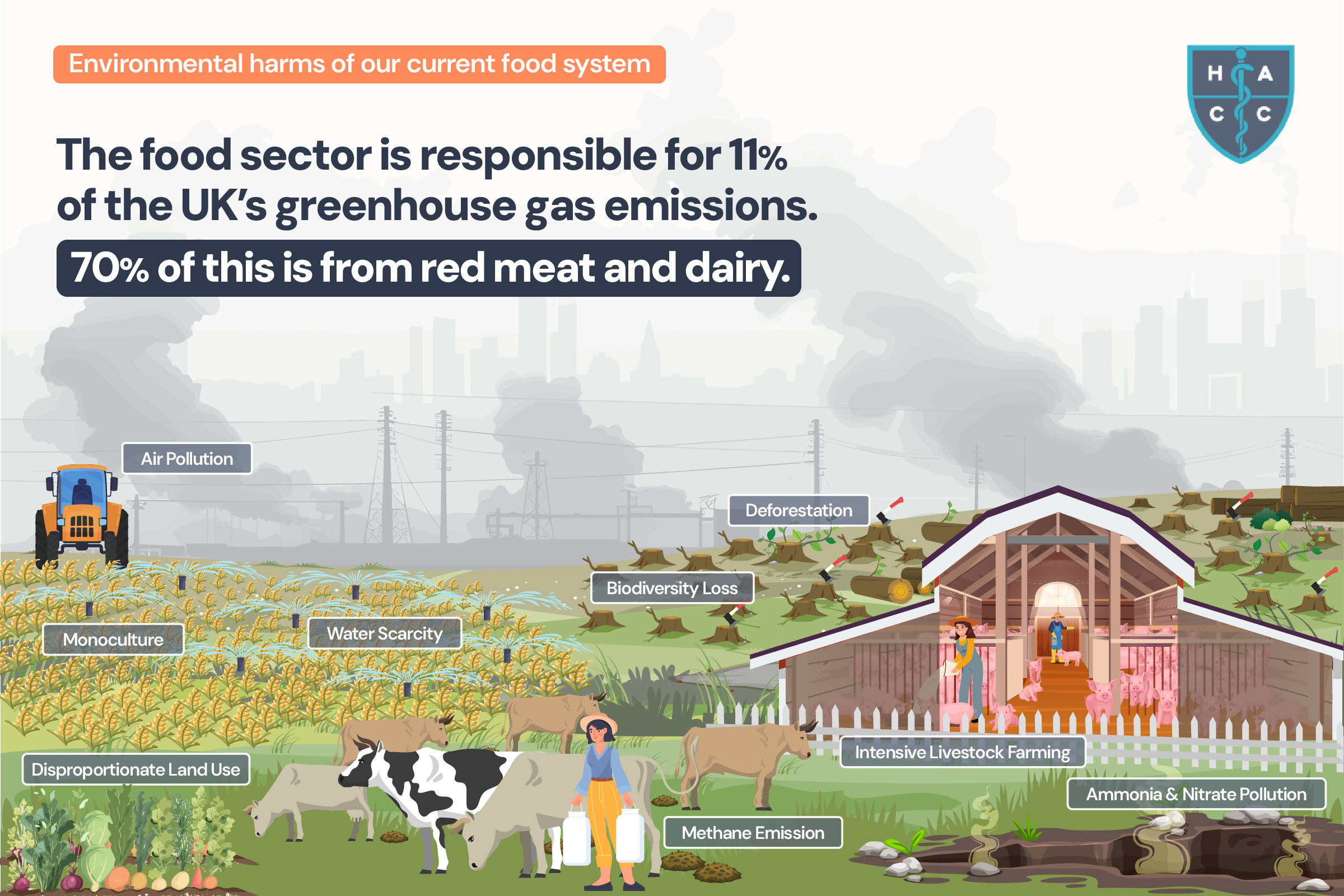
The food sector is responsible for 11% of the UK's greenhouse gas emissions. Source: UKHACC, 2024

Food systems are both a driver of climate change and are also extremely vulnerable to the impacts of climate change. With rising temperatures and worse weather projected by 2100, the nutrient content and yields of crops will likely be affected. UK agriculture might initially benefit by extended growing seasons, but ongoing heating trends and increased extreme weather events will likely strain domestic food production. Domestic supply may drop especially for volatile crops such as fruit and vegetables, which has already reduced by at least 20% since the 1980s. Increased pest pressure may also reduce yields for key crops, potentially intensifying reliance on imports, especially given the rise in demand for tropical fruits. The UK already heavily relies on imported foods from nations vulnerable to climate impacts, with 78% of its fruits and vegetables sourced from these regions. Climate-related sensitivity in exporting countries can disrupt supply chains, leading to shortages and price spikes in the UK. Such disruptions could particularly impact the availability of fruits, vegetables, and whole grains, which are crucial for a healthy diet, leading to issues in food access, affordability, and ultimately, food insecurity.

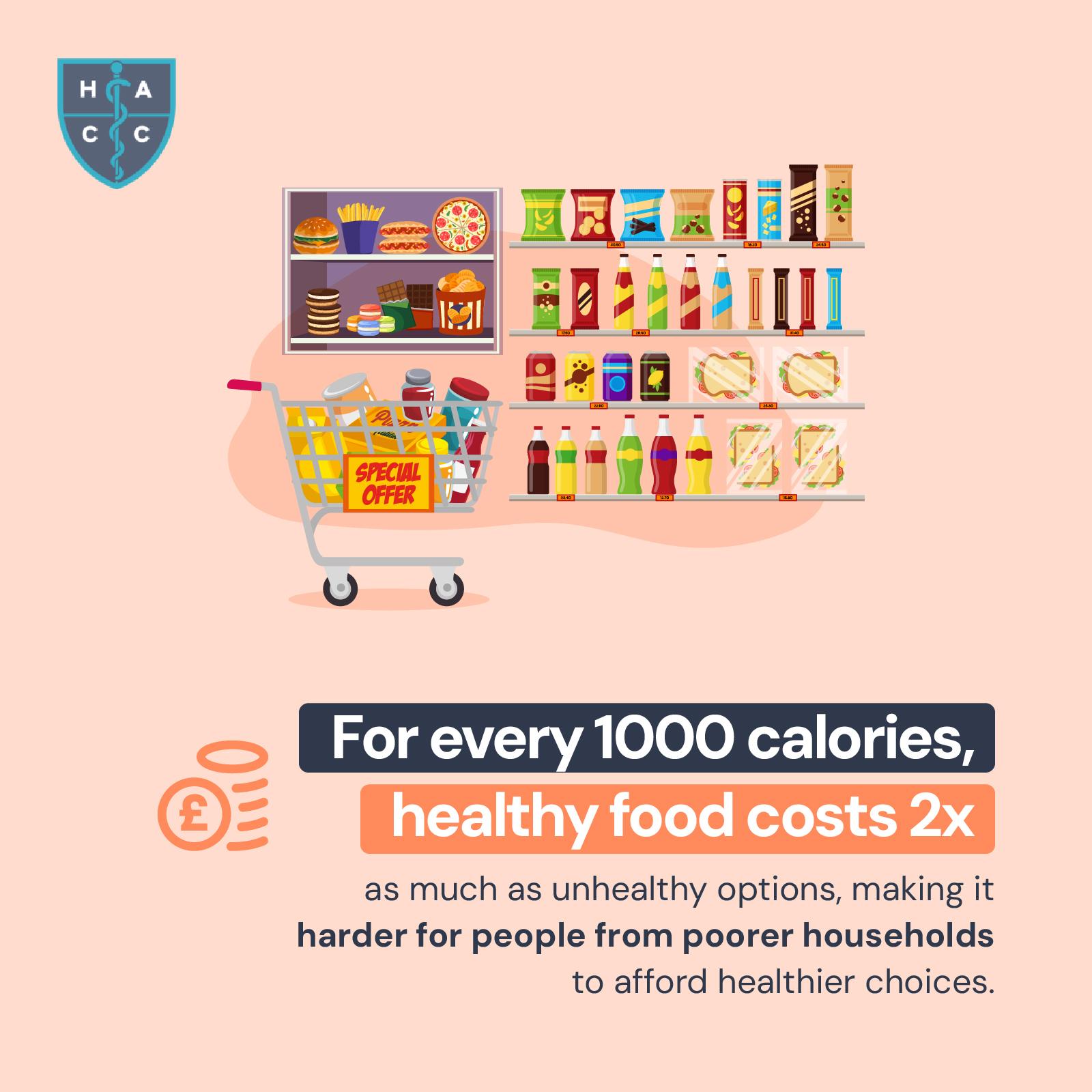
Healthy food is twice as expensive per 1000 calories as unhealthy food.

In the UK in 2020, about 70,000 deaths were linked to insufficient intake of nutritious, plant-based foods, while nearly 42,000 deaths were associated with the overconsumption of dairy, red meat, and processed meats (e.g., meats that have undergone processing to enhance flavour or shelf life). Reduced access to and affordability of nutritious foods may further drive dietary shifts toward cheaper, processed, calorie-dense options. This could exacerbate existing public health issues such as obesity and other diet-related non-communicable diseases, by making it harder for people to afford or access fresh produce. Already, on average, healthy, nutritious foods cost £10 per 1,000 calories, while unhealthy foods that are more likely to cause obesity cost only £4.45 per 1,000 calories. This pattern is widening health inequalities, with individuals from low-income households in deprived socioeconomic areas being twice as likely to be obese and consuming 42% fewer fruits and vegetables than the recommended five daily portions. In this way, 20% of households with children report experiencing food insecurity, rising to 45% of households in receipt of Universal Credit.

== Impact on mental health ==
=== Direct effects ===
Experiencing an extreme weather event can have harmful mental health consequences, in general and in the United Kingdom as well.

There are long-term mental health impacts from experiencing flooding in the United Kingdom, including anxiety during heavy rain, associated with panic attacks, sleep problems, difficulties with concentrating on daily activities, and use of alcohol and prescription medicine. 30% of UK flood victims developed post-traumatic stress disorder (PTSD) whereas in the general population 7.8% of people develop the condition in their lifetime.

Factors that increase the likelihood of psychological distress following flooding include water depth in the house, the absence of flood warnings, displacement (evacuation and temporary housing), and disruption to basic necessities (such as water supply, gas, electricity) and public services (such as health and education).

Gender also affects how flooding is experienced and women are more likely to report PTSD and psychological distress after surviving a flood. Other demographic factors that might be associated with higher levels of distress are being under the age of 65, living in rental accommodation, having a lower income, being unemployed, and having prior medical conditions. Stress levels immediately after flooding are higher for those who are uninsured or have experienced problems with insurance companies.

Based on the reported individual experiences of recovery after the 2013/2014 floods in Somerset, it seems that community as well as institutions (such as emergency services) play an important role in supporting mental health in the immediate aftermath and the longer-term.

Exposure to extreme heat can also negatively impact mental health. Suicide risk, hospital admissions for people living with mental health conditions, anxiety, depression, acute stress have all been linked with extreme heat in the UK and beyond. Heat itself can cause direct physiological changes, such as in blood flow or serotonin levels, and cognitive changes as a result of struggling to sleep. Those taking medication to manage existing mental health conditions may be more affected by heat as the side effects of some of these medications include changes in the regulation of body temperature.

Climate change also disrupts the conditions communities need for good mental health and wellbeing. This includes impacts to air quality, food security, safe housing, transport, education and health care services. Climate change also interacts with other drivers of poor mental health, such as conflict and forced migration. The slower changes caused by climate change, such as damages to land use and ecosystems, also have the potential to lead to mental health consequences. Access to and engagement with natural spaces has a positive effect on mental health. By threatening this, climate change could limit this important source of wellbeing for large sectors of the population.

=== Indirect effects ===
To date, the UK is relatively well protected from direct climate effects, but indirect pathways via awareness of climate change and its implications have important psychological impacts. Such awareness can cause distress, anxiety, grief and overwhelm, sometimes called 'climate anxiety' or 'eco distress'. Strong emotions are part of a rational response to climate change, and can be a powerful motivator for taking climate action. However, these emotions can be challenging to cope with, and climate anxiety can have a significant negative impact on psychological well-being.

Large proportions of populations in countries around the world, including the UK, reported high levels of concern about climate change and distressing climate emotions. Such concern and distress might cause impaired mental health and functioning in young people aged 16 - 25 years and adults. During a survey conducted in 2022, 74% of adults in Great Britain expressed feeling concerned about climate change. This represents the second biggest concern reported by the adult population with only the rising cost of living worrying more people.

Climate distress involves multiple unpleasant emotions including sadness, anger, anxiety, fear, hopelessness, despair, guilt and shame. Although almost half of British people are very concerned about climate change, it is much less common that this concern reaches significant or impairing levels of climate distress with more cognitive, emotional and functional impacts. Both in the UK and beyond, it also appears that climate anxiety is greater in people who are younger, who feel more connected to nature, have higher general anxiety levels and in particular, who look more often for information about climate change.

Both in the UK and beyond, having climate anxiety often comes together with having a lack of trust in and sense of betrayal from those in positions of power (such as governments) who are failing to act urgently and in line with the science to prevent the worst impacts of climate change. Furthermore, anxiety over climate change and government inaction is often paired with conflicted feelings of powerlessness and/or personal responsibility. These phenomenons have led to an argument that climate distress has a moral element in general and in the UK as well.

Pro-environmental behaviour, in the form of volunteering for local community groups, nature-based solutions, e.g., green and social prescribing, and climate activism may protect against anxiety, but these activities could also lead to burnout.

== Other health risks ==
=== Solar radiation ===
Climate change affects how much radiation from the sun (including ultraviolet radiation) reaches the Earth's surface. Only small increases in solar radiation are expected for the UK. However, increasing outdoor temperatures in the UK could lead to people spending more time outdoors, which would increase exposure to solar radiation in general. This may give a health benefit through increased vitamin D, but also may increase skin cancer risks, so the overall effect on health is unclear.

== Effects on specific groups ==
=== Children ===
Children are particularly susceptible to health effects of climate change as their bodies are still developing. Rising global temperatures will expose them to unprecedented physical and psychological health risks. Children are more prone to heat stress because they cannot regulate their body temperature as effectively as adults. Children are particularly vulnerable to poor air quality due to their faster breathing rates and higher air intake relative to their body weight, which increases their exposure to toxic substances in the air.

The psychological effects of climate change are greater in younger age groups, possibly because they have the least power to enact changes, and will face the worst effects of climate change in their lifetime compared to older groups. Climate anxiety and a lack of confidence in government responses is impacting negatively on children and young people resulting in negative beliefs and symptoms of climate distress and climate anxiety. According to UNICEF, nine out of 10 British children are worried about climate change. More than two thirds (73.5%) of these children feel that climate change will affect their human rights in the future.

=== Maternal and women's health ===
Extreme heat presents health risks to pregnant women and their babies. Exposure to heat during can cause changes in the body's heat regulation which can lead to adverse maternal outcomes, including preterm birth, low birth weight, stillbirth, birth defects, gestational diabetes, hypertension disorders, and maternal stress. Higher temperatures are linked to reduced birth weight and each 1°C rise in temperature increases the risk of stillbirths. Preterm births are more common at higher than lower temperatures, especially among women in lower socioeconomic groups and at age extremes. Prenatal exposure to air pollution has been linked with low birth weight, pre-term birth, a greater risk of preeclampsia in women, as well as later compromised lung function and autism spectrum in childhood.

=== Elderly ===
The UK's elderly population are particularly vulnerable to extreme weather events, especially heatwaves and floods due to pre-existing health problems and reduced mobility.

== Mitigation and adaptation ==
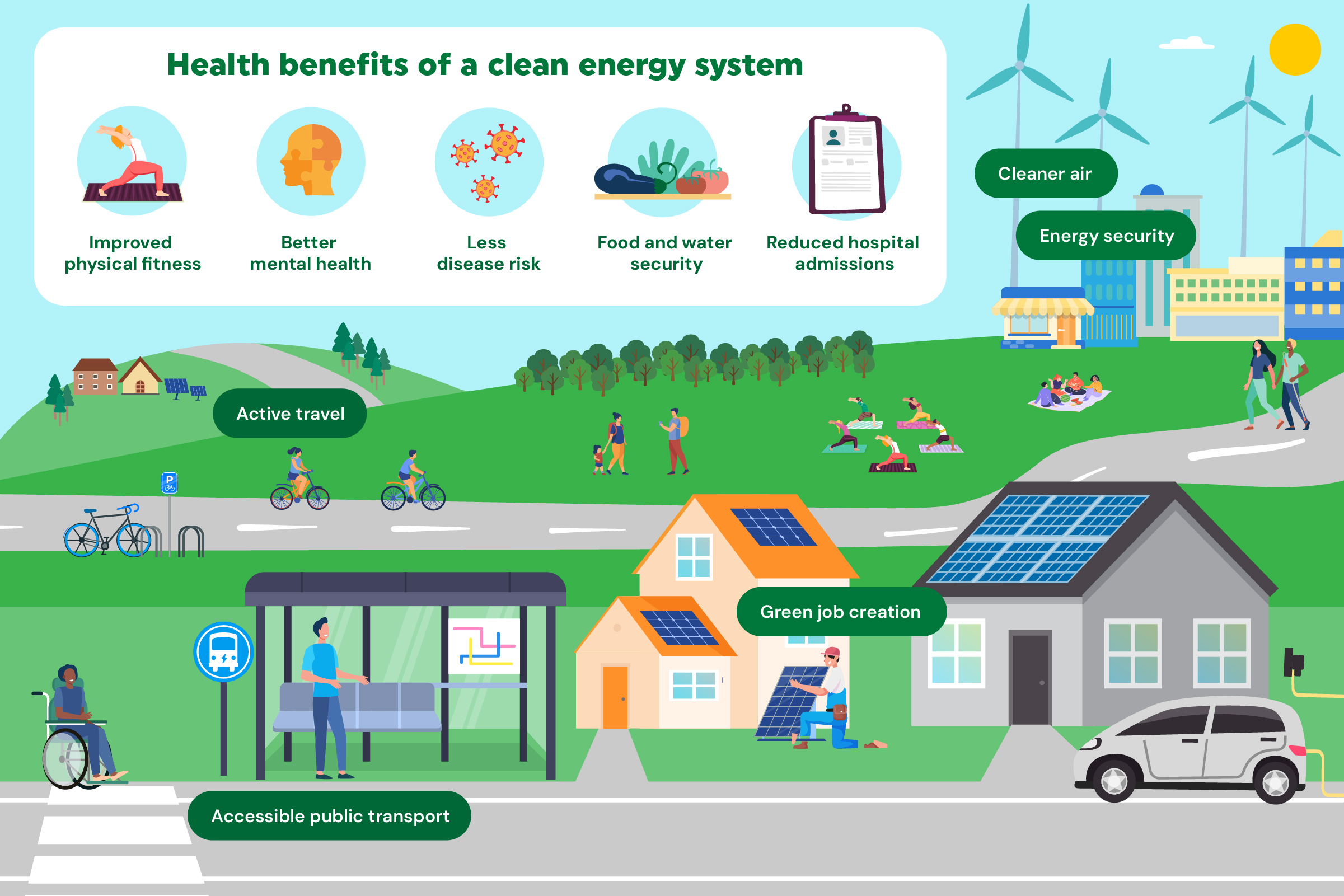
Health benefits of clean energy in the UK.

Climate change mitigation helps to prevent climate change, while adaptation aims to reduce the impacts of climate change.

The UK has committed to reaching net zero by 2050. To achieve this, the government plans to implement several strategies to reduce emissions across the economy. These strategies include sourcing all electricity from low carbon sources, investing in and accelerating the deployment of renewable infrastructure, upscaling hydrogen production, regulating the oil and gas industry, engaging with companies to align with net zero targets, decarbonising the transport sector, and upgrading heating and buildings to optimise energy efficiency.

Recognising the interconnection between health and climate, NHS England has also committed to mitigating its climate impact and aims to reach net zero by 2045. NHS England is estimated to produce 25 megatonnes of carbon dioxide equivalents, approximately 4% of the UK's greenhouse gas emissions. To meet their net zero target, NHS England aims to optimise its estates and facilities, reduce emissions from travel and transport, for example by electrifying its transport fleet and promoting cycling and other modes of transport for staff, decarbonise their supply chain (e.g., employing the NHS Supplier Roadmap which requires suppliers to align with the NHS's net zero target and develop a decarbonisation plan), and use low-carbon medical equipment and pharmaceuticals where possible. For example, desflurane, an anaesthetic gas, has a global warming potential approximately 2,500 times greater than carbon dioxide. NHS Scotland became the first health system globally to fully cease the use of desflurane.

Coupled with mitigation efforts, are strategies to adapt to the effects of climate change. The UK has developed its third National Adaptation Programme (NAP3) to adapt to climate change. Examples of the approach the UK is taking to adapt include building flood defences to protect against rising sea levels, planning for more green spaces to reduce the urban heating effect, and building infrastructure to withstand the effects of climate change.

Increasing the climate resilience of the NHS is a crucial component of climate adaptation. Climate change, and associated extreme weather events, can significantly disrupt health service delivery and access to health facilities, in addition to increasing the burden of climate-related health conditions. NHS England has proposed methods to assess the climate vulnerability and adaptation capacity of the UK's population, as well as monitor impacts of climate change on health and service delivery. These methods include early surveillance of environmental health data (e.g., occurrence and impacts of extreme weather events, air quality exposure) and incidence of climate-related conditions. They also recommend the Strategic Health Asset Planning and Evaluation (SHAPE) tool which health services can use to map out local climate risks, develop emergency responses, and community plans. Upgrading infrastructure, preparing the workforce, and protecting supply chains are also key components of health system adaptation and resilience. However, obstacles to health system adaptation and mitigation efforts include poor policy implementation, lack of political commitment, inadequate data, financial constraints, and challenges in integrating these changes into existing health care structures.

=== Nature-based solutions ===
Nature-based solutions address societal challenges such as climate change or natural disasters by protecting, managing or restoring natural or modified ecosystems for the benefit of humans and nature simultaneously. Examples of nature-based solutions include urban trees, urban green and blue space, and afforested landscapes.

Nature-based solutions such as green roofs and green and blue infrastructure can reduce the urban heat island effect and reduce ambient temperature in cities by shadowing and increasing evapotranspiration. In the UK, urban areas covered 100% by trees can be 10 degrees cooler than areas of continuous urban fabric.

Planting of trees in the upper catchments, or river and wetland restoration can provide protection against flooding. These interventions can also be beneficial to health as a co-benefit by providing outdoor spaces for recreation and for improving mental health. Nature-based solutions also provide other benefits such as improving urban air quality, reducing particulate matter, and increasing of biodiversity and ambient environmental quality.

=== Health impacts of net zero ===
Achieving net zero can have positive effects on health as proposed policy actions would lead to reduced air pollution, increased physical activity, and improved diet. A combination of emission reduction policies related to electricity generation, transport, home energy, active travel, and diets are predicted to result in British people gaining 2 million more cumulative life-years by 2050.

The burning of fossil fuels is a major source of fine particulate matter (PM2.5), which has negative effects on cardiovascular and lung health. Therefore, transitioning away from fossil fuel burning for transport, heating, and electricity production can have health benefits. In the UK, the emissions of PM2.5 from road traffic are greater than that of the electricity generation system, as electricity production has already moved away from the kinds of fossil fuel (e.g. coal) that produce the greatest PM2.5. There is also a substantial emission of PM2.5 from burning of biofuels (mainly wood) for home heating. Decarbonising electricity production in line with the UKs net zero target is expected to reduce PM2.5 concentrations by more than 40% by 2050. This would save 500,000 to 1.1 million cumulative life years by 2154.

Climate change mitigation policies affecting housing can also have positive effects on health and reduce carbon dioxide emission by 0.6 megatonnes. Upgrading housing infrastructure through changing building fabric, ventilation, and energy sources is estimated to save 850 disability-adjusted life years per million population, with the potential to gain 2,200 quality-adjusted life years per 10,000 people over the next 50 years. Policies which improve home energy efficiency (e.g. through insulation) could reduce fuel poverty and cold-related deaths while simultaneously reducing greenhouse gas emissions.

Policies supporting active travel (e.g. walking, cycling) instead of fossil-fuel powered travel could also help reduce greenhouse gas emissions while having large health benefits through increased exercise. If a quarter of the British population cycles regularly, the general death rate could fall by 11% in the UK. If England and Wales meets the European best practice for walking, cycling, and reduced car use, there is the potential for 7.6% reduction in ischaemic heart disease, stroke, dementia, diabetes, depression, and cancers.

Similarly, decreasing consumption of red meat could improve health for many people and would generally reduce greenhouse gas emissions. Replacing half of the UK's meat and dairy consumption with cereals, vegetables, and fruits could reduce dietary emissions by 19% and avert 37,000 premature deaths.

== Social and cultural aspects ==
=== Impact on health systems ===
Increasing health risks due to climate change are expected to result in a growing demand for access to health care, placing an increasing burden on the UK's health care system.

Rising external temperatures can significantly affect in-patients and healthcare workers in care settings like hospitals. This is due to poor ventilation, insufficient cooling systems, building design, and the use of certain materials can lead to higher internal temperatures. Unsuitable thermal conditions in hospitals can affect hospital workers, causing physical discomfort that can impacting on their work performance and decision making.

=== Climate justice ===
Those who have contributed the least to climate change will experience the worst health impacts - this is true globally but also in the UK. Those with lower socioeconomic status will have less resources to both mitigate (e.g. less consumer power for green goods) and adapt to (e.g. home insulation, growing costs of food) climate change.

=== Health equity ===
Health inequalities refer to avoidable, unfair and systematic differences in health between different groups of people. For example, life expectancy varies by almost a decade between some of the least and most deprived parts of the UK. (e.g. around 86 years in Kensington & Chelsea and 76 in Blackpool). Equally important is healthy life expectancy which is the number of years someone can expect to live in good health. By this measure, the gap between the most and least deprived areas can be nearly two decades.

Existing health inequalities are likely to impact individuals' and communities' vulnerability to the impacts of climate change. Health inequalities overlap with other inequalities such as spatial and socio-economic disparities. For example, the most deprived communities often have less access to green spaces in their neighbourhoods. This exacerbates health inequalities, as these populations that are already more vulnerable to climate change impacts, also lack infrastructure like greenspaces that can mitigate the effects of climate change.

The degree to which extreme weather impacts health — particularly mental health — is not solely determined by natural or individual causes. They are also affected by institutional support, gender inequalities, community dynamics, and personal agency.
