= Climate change and agriculture =

Climate change and agriculture may refer to:

- Effects of climate change on agriculture
- Greenhouse gas emissions from agriculture
