= Effects of climate change on human health in Canada =

Climate change in Canada has contributed to a rise in temperatures and extreme weather events that affect human health. Some health outcomes include heat-related illnesses and respiratory conditions, which disproportionately affect populations, particularly low-income communities. The affected groups are mainly influenced by age, socio-economic conditions and pre-existing health conditions.

== Background ==
Climate change has contributed to increases in droughts, floods, and wildfires in Canada. Globally, human activities (anthropogenic activities) have contributed to climate change and have been associated with a 1.7 °C increase in Canada's surface air temperature since 1948. Climate change has impacted multiple areas across Canada and its adjacent oceans, with higher temperatures observed in the northern regions. Future climate projections indicate that temperatures will increase during the winter season. It is also projected that there will be an increasing demand for cooling in Canada for the next 50 years.

Climate change disproportionately affects Canadians, as it varies based on factors such as geographic context, socioeconomic status, and standard of living. Climate change has been associated with economic impacts, contributing to job losses in some regions. Reduced income can limit workers from purchasing their essentials, including water and food. These factors are associated with poor diet and health outcomes. The heavy reliance on fossil fuels has contributed to the presence of greenhouse gases in the atmosphere, which is linked to the spread of infectious diseases among the public. Health outcomes include heat strokes, dehydration, pregnancy issues, allergies, Lyme disease, foodborne illnesses, and physical and mental health impacts. Poverty has also been linked to the environmental and health risks among low-income communities.

== Heat-related health impacts ==
Extreme weather events in Canada have been associated with increased heat-related morbidities and mortalities. In 2021, there were 619 deaths in British Columbia during a heatwave event. In Canada, thousands of hospital admissions and emergency visits occur annually, mostly during the summer season. Mortalities resulting from extreme heat exposure are expected to increase by approximately 10.7% by 2090. The temperature is also projected to become warmer within the region, especially during the months of May and September. The warm season (May-September) has a high probability of becoming longer, resulting in more intense and frequent heat.

During the period 2004-2023, there were approximately 38,398 emergency department (ED) visits. There were two extreme weather events that occurred in Canada in 2018 and 2021. In 2018, there were 8.6 hospitalizations per million population, and in 2021, 32.2 hospitalizations per million population were reported. Heat disproportionately affects certain communities in Canada, and adults aged 80 years or older were reported to have the highest annual rates of hospitalizations. Hospitalization rates were higher among males and increased among those who are 12 years and older. Female hospitalizations occurred mostly for those aged 45 and older. On average, males had higher hospitalization rates, as compared to females aged 12 years or older. Health Canada reported that the data does not cover all the provinces within Canada, which may underestimate the overall impacts on the vulnerable communities. The gender-based hospitalization rates varied among individuals with different age groups. The highest heat-related illnesses were found in older adults aged 80 years and older.

=== Air quality and respiratory health ===
The heavy reliance on fossil fuels has contributed to the increase in greenhouse gas concentrations in the atmosphere, polluting the air we breathe. There are approximately 15,300 premature deaths and health impacts related to air pollution are estimated to be worth $114 billion. Ozone is associated with lung irritation, hospital admissions and early deaths. Long-term exposures to the fine particulate matters in the air have been linked to 570 to 2,700 premature deaths annually. Wildfire smoke has been identified as a major contributor to premature deaths in Canada.

=== Food and water systems ===
Food quality, safety, and security are affected in the prairie provinces such as Alberta, Saskatchewan, and Manitoba. These provinces account for more than 80% of the agricultural land in the region. Canada is considered among the top 5 largest exporters of agricultural products. Extreme weather events like floods can significantly impact the crop yields, food production and distribution across the country.

Water quality, security, and safety have also been affected by climate change, impacting the health of populations. The rise in sea levels, rapid snowmelt, and heavy precipitation can pollute the water systems, reducing the overall supply. These water sources are used for eating and drinking, which can lead to waterborne diseases among the vulnerable communities. In Canada, approximately 14% of the population resides in a rural community and depends on small water sources serving fewer than 300 individuals. Indigenous communities are disproportionately affected by the limited access to clean and safe drinking water. The rapid change in weather events, such as flooding, can result in bacterial contamination within the water systems, which may impact the health of Indigenous groups.

=== Health system impacts ===
The health sector in Canada is a source of greenhouse gas (GHG) emissions per capita. The health sector emits 30 to 50 times more GHG emissions per capita compared to India. The affected members may require hospitalization depending on the severity of the heat-related symptoms. Assessing the impacts of climate change from the health sector in Canada has been a challenge due to limited resources. This can limit the development of proper mitigation measures since addressing climate-related impacts requires coordinated efforts. Climate change is associated with a high risk of cardiovascular and respiratory diseases. Globally, it has been documented that more than 4 million asthma cases resulted from poor air quality. When heat waves intensify and lead to extreme weather events, this places pressure on the health care infrastructure, which in turn affects health care supply chains. In the past, flood events have prevented proper health care delivery services across provincial and territorial jurisdictions in Canada. In 2021, the flood in British Columbia damaged health care sectors and roadways, which prevented access to some areas. The health sector encountered a shortage in medical supplies and were unable to deliver medications. Sick patients were unable to receive the needed treatments due to the floods, which blocked roads. Pollution from the healthcare sector in Canada has resulted in an annual loss of approximately 23,000 disability-adjusted life years, which range between 4,500 and 610,000.

=== Vulnerable populations ===
Vulnerable groups in Canada include children, older adults, chronically ill individuals, visible minorities, racialized populations, and marginalized populations. Children and older adults in Canada have weaker immune systems and are at a higher risk of contracting heat-related illnesses due to the extreme heat events. Poverty is one of the indicators that can increase exposure to climate change. The dimensions of poverty include low income, access to healthcare, homelessness, housing and food security. Low-income groups may also lack resources, which may limit their capacity to effectively respond to extreme weather events like floods. The limited access to resources is also linked to risk of increased illnesses and fatalities for older adults. Pregnant individuals are also impacted since the exposure to heat can affect the fetus.

Métis and Inuit communities depend on the environment for their way of life. Indigenous communities are among the vulnerable populations in Canada that are impacted by the elevated temperatures. Additionally, the Indigenous communities that are impacted by climate change may face barriers due to the limited support from the public health sector in some regions. The Public Health Agency of Canada reported that the Nunavut communities have low GHG emissions per capita. These communities experience global warming at a rate approximately four times higher than the rest of the Canadian population. Inequities are also seen in a global context, as the countries that mostly emit greenhouse gas emissions are least affected by climate change impacts.

=== Health-related outcomes and costs in Quebec ===
The research conducted on climate change focuses on morbidity and mortality rates arising from heat exposure. Climate change is also associated with economic impacts on health. Quebec is composed of 18 regions and represents approximately 22% of the Canadian population. In this context, the historical period represents 1990-2019 and the future projections range from the years 2040-2069. Quebec's historical average temperature during the summer (May-September) was approximately 15.5 °C and is projected to increase by 2.5 °C-3.5 °C between 2040 and 2069. Future projections indicate that hot summers in Quebec are projected to affect 10.5 million residents during 2050-2070. Heat has historically (1990-2019) resulted in 410 fatalities, 200 hospitalizations, 31,900 emergency department visits and 6,100 ambulance transport each summer in Quebec. In the years of 2040-2069, mortality rates and hospital admissions are predicted to increase by 118% and 230%, respectively, including a 65% increase in morbidity rates. These projections are estimated under the normal circumstances of climate change under a threefold increase, without accounting for the potential socioeconomic changes during that period.

By 2050, costs are expected to double due to climate change, with estimates of 85%-135% compared to the historical period (1990- 2019). Population growth is one factor that has been associated with the increase of health risks. Healthcare costs include the direct, indirect, and intangible costs. Direct costs include emergency medical teams, emergency department visits, and hospitalizations. The emergency medical services accounted for 30% of the direct costs due to the increased heat waves and operations. By 2050, the intangible costs are expected to increase due to the losses in well-being that is associated with the increase in population and heat waves. Indirect costs accounted for a greater loss in productivity during 2040-2069. In the years of 1990-2019, Quebec's total annual heat-related health costs were $3.6 billion. Health costs attributed to extreme heat for the projected period are expected to result in a 5-8.5 fold increase. Even under more optimistic climate scenarios, heat waves are predicted to result in significant costs related to heat exposure in 2050. The data on health-related costs can inform adaptation strategies such as reducing urban heat island effects, improving health systems and increasing urban greening strategies.

== Interventions and adaptation strategies ==
Climate change affects public health in numerous ways. The available health data is used to guide adaptation and mitigation strategies. HealthADAPT, which is managed by Health Canada, receives funding to conduct numerous health assessments related to climate change. Public health assessments have been conducted in northern Ontario and the city of Guelph in Waterloo. These areas were assessed due to the high-intensity heat waves and were associated with negative health outcomes.

Health Canada has established an iterative process to manage health risks. This includes the implementation of health monitoring plans, including assessments involving Indigenous communities. Data are collected and integrated into the adaptation and monitoring plans, which may help in reducing morbidities. Proper indicators are then developed to have an effective monitoring plan. This is done through collaboration with stakeholders to ensure that their concerns are addressed in the monitoring plan. This process also includes documenting and evaluating the effectiveness of monitoring and adaptation successes to share the information and lessons learned with the stakeholders and partners. This strategy supports the existing health authorities to implement appropriate strategies within the jurisdiction. The Direction de santé publique de la Montérégie conducted Health Impact Assessments (HIAs) to assess health impacts of projects that are not directly related to the health. These assessments support and encourage municipalities to consider projects that can positively contribute to public health in the decision-making process.

Engaging with other sectors to implement and adjust proposed adaptation and mitigation strategies may improve health outcomes. Green roofing has environmental benefits through the management of stormwater, which may have neutral to positive effects on public health. Reducing carbon dioxide emissions in industrial processes is another method that has been linked with reduced human exposure to hazardous materials. Greenhouse gases are the primary drivers of climate change and can be mitigated by planting more trees, which can reduce carbon dioxide levels.

Heat alert and response systems can be implemented across all provinces in Canada, including the rural areas where Indigenous groups reside. These systems enable the residents to take early precautions like staying hydrated, reducing heat-related health risks. Quebec has implemented a heat warning system, which resulted in fewer medical appointments made by chronically ill seniors in the region of Montérégie. Environment and Climate Change Canada (ECCC) rates the risk and provides health protection measures that vulnerable groups can follow. Indigenous-led actions to develop climate change strategies may support the identification of health-related risks at a community level. The Government of Canada has committed to working in partnership with First Nations, Inuit, and Métis on appropriate climate change and adaptation measures.
