= Sustainable healthcare =

Concept in medical care strategy

Sustainable healthcare is organised medical care that ensures the health needs of the current population are met, without compromising environmental, economic or social resources for future generations.

Commonly used schematics of the tripartite description of sustainability: Left, typical representation of sustainability as three intersecting circles. Right, alternative depictions: literal 'pillars' and a nested circles approach.

The World Health Organization (WHO) defines an environmentally sustainable health care system as ‘as a health system that improves, maintains or restores health, while minimizing negative impacts on the environment and leveraging opportunities to restore and improve it, to the benefit of the health and well-being of current and future generations’.... It aims to reframe medical practice and the health sector to address human health in the context of Planetary health, where earth systems and humans are reciprocal.

Sustainable healthcare acknowledges the three key aspects of Elkington's Triple Bottom Line framework: financial, social, and environmental impacts. It works to restore health by minimizing adverse effects on the environment and financial burdens, as well as protecting the well-being of the current and future generations. In addition to examining Elkington's Triple Bottom Line framework, sustainable healthcare also considers the broader ethical implications it can have on vulnerable populations, such as the potential for unsustainable practices to lead to greater health risks and financial burdens for these populations.

== Climate change ==
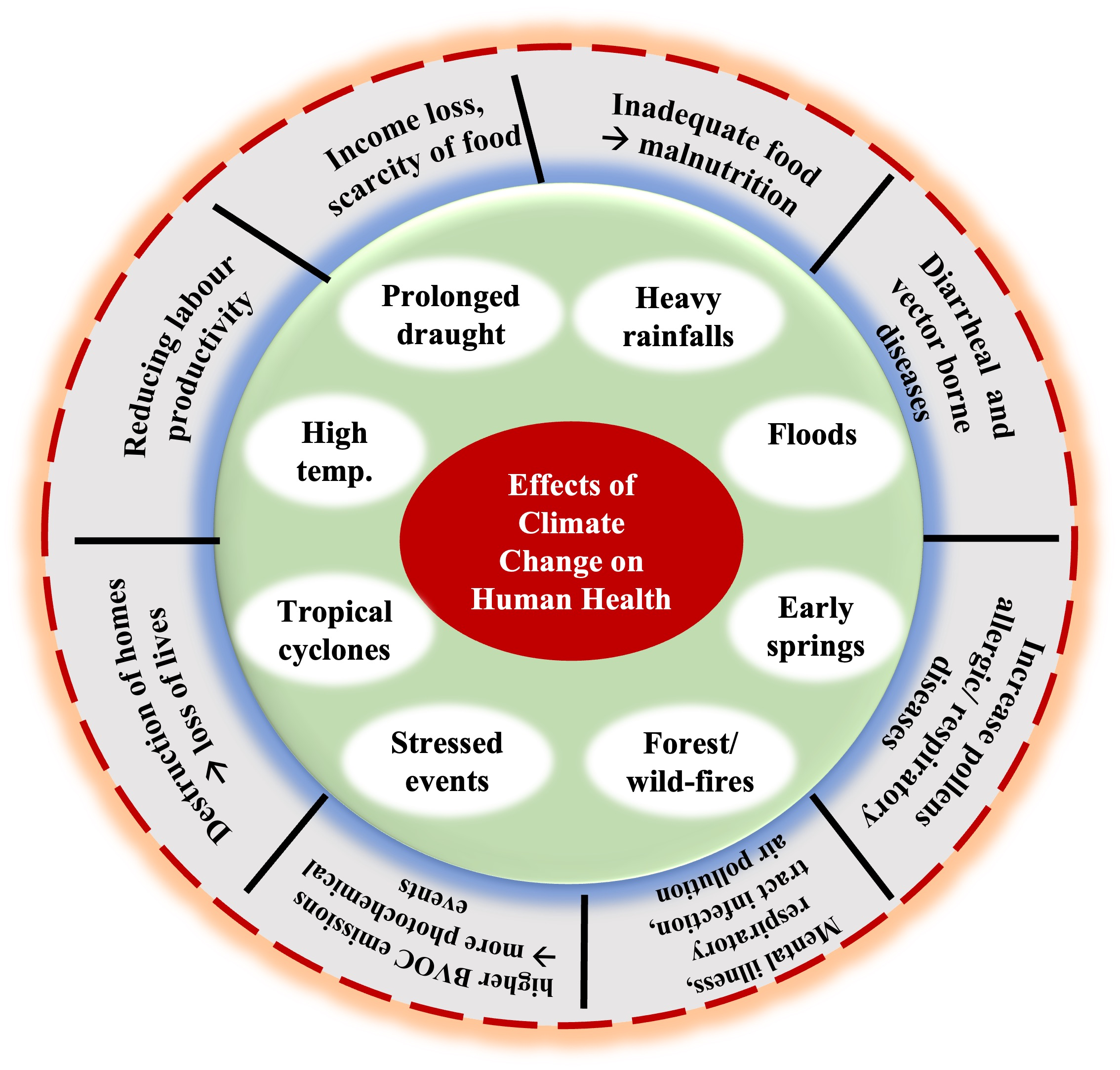
Overview on effect of climate change

The World Health Organization (WHO) has described climate change as the biggest health threat facing humanity, highlighting that those in low-income and disadvantaged communities, who historically contributed least to the causes of climate change, are being affected first and hit the hardest. These concerns are also seen in ‘The Lancet Countdown’, an annual report published in The Lancet medical journal by a group of international experts; it makes an assessment of how climate change is impacting human health. In 2016 the report described the effects of climate change on human health as ‘potentially catastrophic’.

Threats to human health vary from direct injury following extreme weather events, exacerbation of respiratory disease due to air pollution, change in the distribution of vector borne disease, increase likelihood of zoonotic diseases, malnutrition following crop failures, negative impact on mental health, heat related illness and many more.

Healthcare is a significant contributor to climate change and environmental degradation. According to estimates, healthcare is responsible for approximately 4.4% of global net emissions, this means if the worlds healthcare systems were one country, it would be the fifth-largest emitter on the planet.

In addition to greenhouse gas emissions, healthcare also contributes to local air pollution. For example, in England it is estimated that 3.5% of all road travel in the country is related to the National Health Service (NHS); due to a combination of patient, visitor and staff travel and delivery of supplies. The waste generated by healthcare, such as pharmaceuticals and plastic pollution, also has a negative impact on planetary health. In the United States, it is estimated that pollution caused by healthcare results in a loss of 388,000 disability-adjusted life years (DALYs) annually.

Reducing the environmental impact of healthcare has a positive impact on both climate change and human health.

== Medical waste ==
Medical waste is defined as any type of waste that originates from healthcare, its facilities, and its practices, and is considered a significant component of unsustainable healthcare, with financial, social, and environmental implications. In the United States, around 3.2 million tons of medical waste are generated annually. It can be non-hazardous, such as packaging material, or hazardous, including gloves, vials, sharps, single-use plastics, and medication. These hazardous wastes can contain some form of bodily fluids, chemical substances, or radioactive materials that are harmful to public health and the environment.

Medical waste can be disposed of through incineration, which can contribute to greenhouse gas emissions and air pollution, or through autoclaving. However, both methods lead to landfill disposal, which can lead to water and soil pollution. In addition to adverse environmental impacts, medical disposal methods can lead to financial consequences. Often, medical waste is improperly sorted in healthcare facilities, causing nonhazardous waste to be unnecessarily classified as infectious. This ultimately can lead to higher disposal costs within the United States.

In the United States, the federal legislation oversight of medical waste increased after the establishment of the Medical Waste Tracking Act of 1988, which encouraged more careful tracking and cautious disposal. Despite the legislation, medical waste remains a contemporary issue. In response, sustainable healthcare initiatives have promoted strategies that decrease the use of single-use plastics, improve waste segregation between hazardous and nonhazardous materials, and reduce overconsumption of medication and PPE.

== Health risks of unsustainable practices ==
As part of unsustainable healthcare practices, medical waste management can present severe health risks to healthcare employees and the general population. Unsustainable healthcare practices, mainly pertaining to medical waste, are most dangerous to human health. Medical waste can be hazardous as it can be soaked in bodily fluids and can contain radioactive, sharps, or toxic materials. Waste generated by healthcare can therefore enable the transmission of diseases and infection, as well as sharp needles and objects can physically hurt people.

Before transport to waste disposal facilities, medical waste is often handled and sorted within healthcare institutions themselves through labeled tins and management systems. In general, these systems require healthcare personnel to manage, making them at greater risk of exposure to disease and health hazards than the general population. Furthermore, the risk of disease exposure decreases as waste is transported farther from its original source, making it the most dangerous within healthcare facilities themselves.

However, unsustainable healthcare practices still pose a risk for the general population who can find and interact with medical waste when not properly disposed of or regulated. For instance, in 1988, vials containing Hepatitis B and AIDS were washing up on New England beaches, allowing for disease transmission to easily occur. Also, people who live near medical waste landfill sites often have higher levels of lead, increase risk of birth defects, and a lower birth rate. Thus, unsustainable practices in medical waste can present a risk to human health.

== Financial and Economic Impacts ==
Unsustainable healthcare can increase financial costs, in addition to posing threats to the environment and the public population. In the U.S. alone, medical waste costs account for 25% of total U.S. healthcare spending, ranging from $760 billion to $935 billion. A lot of this medical waste can be attributed to inefficient medical practices and waste disposal. These can include misclassification of medical waste as hazardous as well as the overuse of single-use disposables and pre-packaged medical equipment kits. Together, these practices lead to more expensive disposal methods. In fact, the United States spends around $790 per tonne of medical waste generated to dispose of it.

One major complexity underlying these inefficiencies is the fact that healthcare professionals are often unaware of the costs of medical equipment and waste disposal. In a cross-sectional study across 49 U.S. hospitals, results from a survey declared that 24.3% of the staff were unaware of the hospital's local costs for medical equipment, and hospitals that reported the highest cost-consciousness actually were the least accurate in estimating costs of medical equipment, laboratory supplies, and medications. This gap in knowledge can ultimately contribute to the overuse and mismanagement of resources, including the excessive overuse of single-use protective gear such as gloves, lab coats, and goggles. While proper protective gear is essential for infection control and prevention, it can exacerbate medical waste generation and thus, healthcare spending.

== Environmental Justice and Ethical Concerns ==
Unsustainable health practices related to medical waste have been associated with disproportionate impacts on minorities and lower socioeconomic status communities through medical waste disposal. Medical waste is disposed of through two methods: incineration and autoclaving. Incineration involves burning waste at high temperatures, causing toxins such as dioxins, furans, and mercury to be released. Dioxins and furans are cancer-causing compounds and are linked to reproductive harm and immune system deficiencies, and mercury emissions can irritate and damage the nervous and respiratory systems . On the other hand, autoclaving treatment involves treating waste with dry heat or steam to sterilize the waste and kill any pathogens present. This is often considered a more sustainable disposal method due to the reduction of harmful toxins released. However, both methods lead to waste eventually being stored in landfills.

Incineration, a less sustainable practice, is often attributed to many health risks and diseases. Reported health effects include, but are not limited to, headaches, fatigue, sleepiness, drowsiness, asthma, low birth weight, birth defects, heart issues, etc. Cancers such as leukemia, bladder cancer, brain cancer, and hepatobiliary cancer are among the concerns of greater risks for residents near these sites. Also, exposure to pollution can lead to respiratory issues, where coughing, wheezing, and persistent colds are common and persistent within populations surrounding incinerators.

While the United States has started to crack down on medical waste incineration sites, there are still numerous sites in operation today. For example, in Baltimore, the Curtis Bay Medical Waste Incinerator continues to operate in lower socio-economic communities and has been associated with concerns regarding its impact on their health. According to a study done on it, the incinerator is related to $36.9 million a year in health damages. Residents who live near it have greater rates of asthma and respiratory irritation as well as increased rates of mortality and illness compared to those living farther from these sites. Additionally, not only does the incinerator compromise the health of these communities, but it also further burdens them with economic and environmental challenges that they are already navigating.

== Approaches ==
In 2017 the World Health Organization (WHO) published a strategic document outlining 10 actions points to improve environmental sustainability in healthcare systems. This included points such as sustainable procurement, reducing air pollution and greenhouse gas emissions from healthcare, prioritising public health measures to prevent disease and improving efficiency of resource use.

In 2021, prior to the 26th UN Climate Change Conference of Parties (COP) in Glasgow, a joint editorial published simultaneously in 233 medical journals around the world highlighted the health consequences of climate change and the need for immediate political action. It also called on healthcare professionals to ‘join in the work of achieve environmentally sustainable health systems before 2030’. Emphasizing that this will inevitably mean a change in clinical practice.

=== Greener NHS ===
One example of a healthcare system making changes towards sustainability is the UK’s National Health Service (NHS). In 2020 it became the first healthcare service in the world to commit to a target of net zero. To achieve this target the ‘Greener NHS programme’ was created. In 2020 Greener NHS published a report ‘Delivering a Net Zero National Health Service’, which outlines how the NHS can achieve net zero. In this report the sources of carbon emissions across the NHS are summarised, this highlights various ‘hotspots’ where a high proportion of emissions can be targeted. Estates and facilities (including building energy) is highlighted as one hotspot, but there are also opportunities for change in supply chain, pharmaceuticals, medical devices and travel; all of which are directly influenced by the choices of clinicians, recognising that a change in clinical practice will be required.

=== Oral Medication Waste Reduction ===
Medication is integral to improving health; however, it has profound environmental effects by acting as a major contributor to greenhouse gas emissions through incineration and can be toxic to environmental life. Also, oral medication, especially cancer drugs, have become increasingly expensive, causing people to carry a large financial burden. To combat the environmental and financial implications of medication, many states have implemented Drug Repository programs for cancer medication, where individuals can donate their excess and unused medication for other individuals. Specifically, in 2023, a Cancer and Hematology center in Grand Rapids, Michigan, launched its own Cancer Drug Repository Program in Western Michigan. The program has aimed to enable Michigan residents to donate and exchange unused cancer medication, with hopes to alleviate the financial burden of cancer drugs as well as reduce environmental repercussions through waste reallocation.

=== Healthcare without Harm ===
Healthcare without Harm is a nongovernmental organization (NGO) that aims to reduce the environmental impact of healthcare around the world. It was established in the United States of America (USA) in 1996 after a team of health care professionals realised the bi-products of the medical waste incinerators were having a direct negative impact on the health of the local population. The organisation now works internationally to assist health care organisations in delivering healthcare, without negatively impacting human health or causing environmental damage.

=== Global Climate and Health Alliance ===
The Global Climate and Health Alliance (GCHA) is an international organisation of health care and development groups. The aim of the organisation is centred around minimising the health impacts of climate change and encouraging the health co-benefits achieved by tackling climate change.

=== Five Principles ===
The ‘Five Principles of Sustainable Healthcare’ have been proposed as a model to facilitate sustainable decision making at all levels of the healthcare system and clinical practice. The order of the principles was specifically designed to reflect their power (and therefore importance) to achieve sustainable change

In order they are ‘Prevention’ (preventing disease and encouraging healthier populations), ‘patient self-care’ (equipping patients to manage own health), ‘lean service delivery’ (improving efficiency), ‘low carbon alternatives’ (of treatments or interventions where available) and ‘facilities’ (minimising environmental impact of infrastructure).

=== Sustainability in Quality Improvement ===
The quality of care delivered in a health care system often depends on a complex network of processes and pathways. Quality Improvement in healthcare is when health care professionals familiar with these processes and pathways use a systematic approach to address specific problems in their field, thereby improving the process or pathway with a measurable effect. Traditionally this measurable effect may be improved clinical outcomes, time saved or money saved.

Sustainable quality improvement (SusQI) looks to take a broad view of the measurable effect, considering social and environmental outcomes alongside financial ones. This is also known as the Triple Bottom Line. This principle was applied to the sustainable value of healthcare by including sustainability as a domain of quality in healthcare. Rather than just assessing a treatment or interventions value against its clinical outcome and financial cost, social and environmental cost are also considered.
